This is a list of places in the United States which are named after people. If not cited here, the etymology is generally referenced in the article about the person or the place.

A
Aaronsburg, Pennsylvania – Aaron Levy (founder)
Abbot, Maine – John Abbot (treasurer of Bowdoin College)
Abbott, Texas – Joseph Abbott (Texas politician)
Abbottstown, Pennsylvania – John Abbott (founder)
Abernathy, Texas – Monroe Abernathy (one of the developers of the town)
Abington, Massachusetts – Anne Venables Bertie, Countess of Abington, Cambridgeshire
Ableman, Wisconsin – S.V.R. Ableman (settler)
Ackley, Iowa – J.W. Ackley (founder) 
Acworth, New Hampshire – Jacob Acworth (British naval officer) 
Ada Township, Michigan – Ada Smith (daughter of postmaster) 
Adairville, Kentucky – John Adair (governor of Kentucky) 
Adams, California – Charles Adams (landowner)
Adams, Massachusetts – Samuel Adams
Adams, Nebraska – J.O. Adams (settler)
Adams, New York – John Adams
Adams, Oregon – John F. Adams (homesteader)
Adams, Tennessee – Reuben Adams (landowner)
Adamsboro, Indiana – George E. Adams (founder)
Adamsburg, Pennsylvania – John Adams
Adams Station, California – Marie Adams Peacock (tavern owner)
Adamstown, California – George Adams (founder)
Adamstown, Pennsylvania – John Adams
Adamsville, Arizona – Charles S. Adams (original settler)
Addison, 4 places in Maine, New York, Pennsylvania, and Vermont – Joseph Addison (English essayist, poet, playwright and politician)
Addison, West Virginia – Addison McLaughlin (local lawyer)
Adin, California – Adin McDowell (founder)
Adrian, Michigan – Roman Emperor Hadrian
Adrian, Minnesota – Mrs. Adrian Iselin (mother of Adrian C. Iselin, a director of the Sioux City and St. Paul Railroad Company)
Aguilar, Colorado – José Ramón Aguilar (cattleman and pioneer)
Aiken, South Carolina – William Aiken Jr. (governor of South Carolina)
Ainsworth, Iowa – D.H. Ainsworth (civil engineer)
Ainsworth, Washington – J.C. Ainsworth (railroader)
Albany, New Hampshire – James of York and Albany (indirectly, via Albany, New York)
Albany, New York – James of York and Albany
Albemarle, North Carolina – George Monck, 1st Duke of Albemarle
Alberhill, California – C.H. Albers, James and George Hill (landowners)
Albert Lea, Minnesota – Albert Miller Lea (engineer, soldier, and topographer with the United States Dragoons)
Alberton, Montana – Albert J. Earling (president of the Chicago, Milwaukee, St. Paul and Pacific Railroad)
Albuquerque, New Mexico – Francisco Fernández de la Cueva, 8th Duke of Alburquerque
Alburgh, Vermont – Ira Allen (landowner)
Alcester, South Dakota – Colonel Alcester of the British army
Alden, California – S.E. Alden (farmer and landowner)
Alden, Iowa – Henry Alden (settler)
Alderson, West Virginia – John Alderson (settler and local minister)
Alexander, New York – Alexander Rea (settler and state senator)
Alexander, Maine – Alexander Baring, 1st Baron Ashburton
Alexandria, Nebraska – S.J. Alexander (secretary of state)
Alexandria, New York and Alexandria Bay, New York – Alexander Le Ray (son of local settler)
Alexandria, New Hampshire – John Alexander (indirectly, via Alexandria, Virginia)
Alexandria, South Dakota – Alexander Mitchell (railroad president)
Alexandria, Virginia – John Alexander (settler)
Alford, Massachusetts – Colonel John Alford
Alfordsville, Indiana – James Alford (settler)
Alfred, Maine – King Alfred the Great
Alger, Ohio – Russell A. Alger
Alice, Texas – Alice Gertrudis King Kleberg (daughter of Richard King, who established the King Ranch)
Allendale, Oakland, California – Charles E. Allen (real estate broker)
Allendale, South Carolina – Allen family (settlers)
Allenstown, New Hampshire – Samuel Allen (father of landowner and governor of New Hampshire)
Allentown, Georgia – J.W. Allen (postmaster)
Allentown, Pennsylvania – William Allen
Alloway Township, New Jersey – Chief Alloway
Alma, Colorado – Alma James (wife of local merchant)
Almont, Michigan – Juan Almonte
Alstead, New Hampshire – Johann Heinrich Alsted (compiled an early encyclopedia that was popular at Harvard College) (note spelling)
Altheimer, Arkansas – Joseph and Louis Altheimer (founders)
Alton, California – Alton Easton (indirectly, via Alton, Illinois)
Alton, Illinois – Alton Easton (son of founder Rufus Easton)
Alva, Florida – Thomas Alva Edison (inventor)
Alvarado, California – Juan Alvarado (Mexican governor of California)
Alvin, Texas – Alvin Morgan (settler)
Amador City, California – Jose Maria Amador (early gold prospector)
Ambler, Pennsylvania – Joseph Ambler (settler)
Amelia Court House, Virginia – Princess Amelia of Great Britain
Ames, New York – Fisher Ames
Amherst, New Hampshire -- Jeffery Amherst, 1st Baron Amherst (also Massachusetts and Maine)
Anaheim, California – Saint Anne (indirectly, via the Santa Ana River)
Anastasia Island, Florida – Saint Anastasia
Anderson, Indiana – Chief William Anderson
Anderson, Kansas – Joseph C. Anderson (state legislator)
Anderson, South Carolina – Gen. Robert Anderson
Andersonia, California – Jeff Anderson (sawmill owner)
Andrade, California – Mexican General Guillermo Andrade
Angelica, New York – Angelica Schuyler Church
Angels Camp, California – Henry P. Angel (early settler and merchant)
Ankeny, Iowa – John Fletcher Ankeny
Anna, Illinois – Anna Davis (landowner's wife)
Annapolis, Maryland – Anne, Queen of Great Britain
Ann Arbor, Michigan – Ann Allen and Ann Rumsey (settlers' wives)
Annsville, New York – Ann Bloomfield (settler's wife)
Anson, Maine – George Anson, 1st Baron Anson
Anson, Wisconsin - Anson Burlingame (abolitionist, legislator, diplomat)
Ansonia, Connecticut – Anson Greene Phelps
Ansted, West Virginia – David T. Ansted (geologist and landowner)
Antis Township, Pennsylvania – Frederick Antes (colonel who fought during the Revolutionary War) (note spelling)
Anthony, Kansas – George T. Anthony (7th Governor of Kansas)
Applebachsville, Pennsylvania – Gen. Paul Applebach
Applegate, California – Lisbon Applegate (early settler)
Appleton, Maine and Appleton, Wisconsin – Samuel Appleton (father-in-law of Amos Lawrence, founder of Lawrence University)
Appling, Georgia – Col. Dan Appling
Arbuckle, California – Tacitus R. Arbuckle (early landowner and settler)
Archdale, North Carolina – John Archdale
Arco, Idaho – Georg von Arco
Arenzville, Illinois – Francis A. Arenz (founder)
Arietta, New York – Arietta Rensselaer (wife of Rensselaer van Rensselaer)
Arlington, Texas – Henry Bennet, 1st Earl of Arlington (indirectly, via Arlington House, The Robert E. Lee Memorial)
Armourdale, Kansas – Armour brothers (founders of Armour and Company)
Arnold, California – Bob and Bernice Arnold (early local merchants)
Arnold Heights, California – General Henry H. Arnold
Arundel, Maine – Lord Arundel
Arvada, Colorado – Hiram Arvada Haskin (brother-in-law of settler Mary Wadsworth)
Arvin, California – Arvin Richardson (pioneer)
Asbury Park, New Jersey – Francis Asbury
Ashburnham, Massachusetts – John Ashburnham, 2nd Earl of Ashburnham
Ashbyburg, Kentucky – Gen. Stephen Ashby
Asheboro, North Carolina – Samuel Ashe (governor of North Carolina)
Asherville, Indiana – John Asher (founder)
Ashford, Alabama – Thomas Ashford
Ashley, Michigan – H.W. Ashley (manager of the Ann Arbor Railroad)
Ashley River (South Carolina) – Anthony Ashley Cooper, 1st Earl of Shaftesbury
Astor, Florida and Astor Park, Florida – William Backhouse Astor, Sr.
Astoria, Oregon – John Jacob Astor
Atchison, Kansas – David Rice Atchison (Missouri Senator) 
Aten, Nebraska – John Aten (state senator)
Athol, Massachusetts – James Murray, 2nd Duke of Atholl 
Atkinson, Maine – Judge Atkinson (landholder)
Atkinson, New Hampshire – Theodore Atkinson (landowner)
Atwater, California – Marshall D. Atwater (farmer, landowner)
Atwater, Minnesota – Isaac Atwater (settler of St. Paul)
Atwater Township, Ohio – Amzi Atwater (surveyor)
Atwood, Kansas – Attwood Matheny (founder's son)
Auberry, California – Al Yarborough
Audubon, Minnesota – John James Audubon
Augusta, Georgia – Princess Augusta of Saxe-Gotha
Augusta, Kansas – Augusta James (trader's wife)
Augusta, Maine – Augusta Dearborn (daughter of Henry Dearborn)
Ault, Colorado – Alexander Ault (flour mill owner)
Aurelius, New York – Marcus Aurelius (Roman emperor)
Austin, Minnesota – Austin Nichols (settler)
Austin, Texas – Stephen F. Austin
Ave Maria, Florida – Mary, mother of Jesus
Averill, Vermont – Samuel Averill (landholder)
Avery, California – George J. Avery (first postmaster)
Averys Gore, Vermont – Samuel Avery (Westminster deputy sheriff and jailkeeper)
Axtell, Kansas – Dr. Jesse Axtell (officer of the St. Joseph and Grand Island Railway)
Ayer, Massachusetts – Dr. James Cook Ayer (patent-medicine manufacturer)

B
Bagby, California – Benjamin A. Bagby (merchant, hotelier, innkeeper)
Bainbridge, New York – Commodore William Bainbridge
Baird, Texas – Matthew Baird (president of Baldwin Locomotive Works)
Baker, Montana – A.G. Baker (engineer with the Chicago, Milwaukee, St. Paul and Pacific Railroad)
Baker City, Oregon – Senator Edward D. Baker (indirectly via Baker County, Oregon)
Baker County, Florida – James McNair Baker, judge and Confederate Senator
Bakersfield, California – Colonel Thomas Baker
Bakersfield, Vermont – Joseph Baker (landowner)
Baldwin, Georgia – Abraham Baldwin (U.S. Senator)
Baldwin, Maine – Colonel Loammi Baldwin (namesake of the Baldwin apple)
Baldwin, Michigan – Governor Henry P. Baldwin
Baldwin, Chemung County, New York – Isaac, Thomas, and Walter Baldwin (settlers)
Baldwin, Wisconsin – D.A. Baldwin (settler)
Baldwin City, Kansas – John Baldwin
Baldwinsville, New York – Dr. Jonas Baldwin (settler)
Ballantine, Montana – E.P. Ballantine (homesteader)
Ballston, New York and Ballston Spa, New York – Rev. Eliphalet Ball (settler)
Baltimore, Maryland – Lord Baltimore
Banning, California – Phineas Banning, stagecoach line owner and Father of the Port of Los Angeles.
Baraboo, Wisconsin – Jean Baribault (settler)
Baraga, Michigan – Bishop Friedrich Baraga
Barber, California – O. C. Barber (president of the Diamond Match Company)
Barberton, Ohio – O. C. Barber (president of the Diamond Match Company)
Barboursville, West Virginia – Philip P. Barbour (governor of Virginia)
Bard, California – Thomas R. Bard (irrigation district official)
Bardstown, Kentucky – David Bard, who obtained the original town site from the governor of Virginia, and his brother William Bard, who surveyed the site
Bargersville, Indiana – Jefferson Barger
Baring Plantation, Maine – Alexander Baring, 1st Baron Ashburton
Barker, Broome County, New York – John Barker (settler)
Barlow, Oregon – John L. Barlow (settler)
Barnard, Vermont – Sir Francis Bernard (landholder) (note spelling)
Barnes, Kansas – A.S. Barnes (publisher)
Barnum, Denver, Colorado – P. T. Barnum (landowner)
Barnwell, South Carolina – Barnwell family
Barre, Massachusetts, Barre, New York, Barre (city), Vermont and Barre (town), Vermont – Isaac Barré (Irish soldier and politician)
Barrington, New Hampshire and Barrington, Rhode Island – John Shute Barrington, 1st Viscount Barrington (brother of Samuel Shute, governor of Massachusetts)
Barron, Wisconsin – Henry D. Barron (judge)
Barstow, California – William Barstow Strong (ATSF president)
Bartlett, Illinois – Luther Bartlett
Bartlett, New Hampshire – Dr. Josiah Bartlett
Bartlett Springs, California – Green Bartlett (resort owner)
Barton, Vermont – General William Barton
Bartow, Florida and Bartow, Georgia – Francis S. Bartow (Confederate general)
Bastrop, Louisiana and Bastrop, Texas – Felipe Enrique Neri, Baron de Bastrop (Dutch embezzler who falsely claimed to be a nobleman)
Batesville, Arkansas – James Woodson Bates
Batesville, Ohio – Rev. Timothy Bates
Bath, New Hampshire – William Pulteney, 1st Earl of Bath
Bath, New York – Henrietta Pulteney, Countess of Bath
Battleboro, North Carolina – James S. and Joseph Battle (railroaders)
Bayard, West Virginia – Thomas F. Bayard (U.S. Senator from Delaware)
Bayfield, Wisconsin – Rear Admiral Henry Wolsey Bayfield
Bay St. Louis, Mississippi – Louis IX of France
Beacon, Iowa – Benjamin Disraeli, Earl of Beaconfield
Beals, Maine – Manwaring Beal (settler)
Bealville, California – Edward Fitzgerald Beale (landowner)
Beardstown, Illinois – Thomas Beard (settler)
Beatrice, Humboldt County, California – Beatrice White (first postmaster)
Beattie, Kansas – A. Beattie (mayor of St. Joseph, Missouri)
Beattyville, Kentucky – Samuel Beatty (settler)
Beaufort, North Carolina and Beaufort, South Carolina – Henry Somerset, 2nd Duke of Beaufort
Beauregard, Mississippi – P. G. T. Beauregard (Confederate general)
Beaumont, Texas – Jefferson Beaumont (early settler and public official)
Becker, Minnesota – George Loomis Becker (mayor of Saint Paul)
Beckley, West Virginia – Gen. Alfred Beckley (settler)
Beckwourth, California – James Beckwourth, adventurer and early settler
Bedford, Massachusetts – Wriothesley Russell, 2nd Duke of Bedford
Bedford, New Hampshire and Bedford, Virginia – John Russell, 4th Duke of Bedford
Bedford, Tennessee – Thomas Bedford
Beebe, Arkansas – Roswell Beebe (settler)
Beecher City, Illinois – Charles A. Beecher (railroader)
Beekman, New York – Henry Beekman (landowner)
Beekmantown, New York – William Beekman (landowner)
Beeville, Texas – Barnard E. Bee, Sr. (served as Secretary of State and Secretary of War for the Republic of Texas) (indirectly, via Bee County, Texas)
Belchertown, Massachusetts – Jonathan Belcher (governor of Massachusetts and New Jersey)
Belden, California – Robert Belden (first postmaster)
Belleville, Kansas – Arabelle Tutton (landowner's wife)
Bellingham, Massachusetts – Governor Richard Bellingham
Bellingham, Washington – Sir William Bellingham, 1st Baronet
Bellmont, New York – William Bell (landowner)
Bellows Falls, Vermont – Colonel Benjamin Bellows (landowner)
Bellwood, Nebraska – D.J. Bell (landowner)
Belmont, Missouri and Belmont, New Hampshire – August Belmont (financier)
Belton, Texas – Governor Peter Hansborough Bell
Beltrami, Minnesota – Giacomo Beltrami
Belva, West Virginia – Belva Ann Lockwood
Belzoni, Mississippi – Giovanni Battista Belzoni
Bemis Heights, New York – Jonathan Bemis (innkeeper)
Benedicta, Maine – Bishop Benedict Fenwick (landowner)
Benicia, California – Francisca Benicia Carillo de Vallejo (wife of Mariano Guadalupe Vallejo)
Benner Township, Pennsylvania – General Phillip Benner (ironmaster)
Bennett, Iowa – Chet Bennett (railroader)
Bennettville, California – Thomas Bennett (mining company president)
Bennington, New Hampshire – colonial governor Benning Wentworth (indirectly, via Bennington, Vermont)
Bennington, Vermont – colonial governor Benning Wentworth
Benton, 7 places in Arkansas, California, Kentucky, Louisiana, Maine, Minnesota, and New Hampshire – Senator Thomas Hart Benton
Benton, New York – Levi Benton (settler)
Benton Hot Springs, California – Senator Thomas Hart Benton
Bentonia, Mississippi – Bentonia Green (resident)
Bentonville, Arkansas – Senator Thomas Hart Benton
Benwood, West Virginia – Benjamin Latrobe II
Beresford, South Dakota – Lord Charles Beresford
Berkeley, California – Bishop George Berkeley
Berkeley Springs, West Virginia – colonial governor William Berkeley
Berkley, Massachusetts – Bishop George Berkeley (The extra 'e' was apparently dropped by mistake when officially registered by the State House)
Berkley, Virginia – Norborne Berkeley, 4th Baron Botetourt
Bermuda, 5 places in Alabama, Georgia, Louisiana, South Carolina, and Tennessee – Juan de Bermúdez (indirectly, after Bermuda)
Bernards Township, New Jersey – Sir Francis Bernard of Nether Winchendon House, England
Bernardston, Massachusetts – Sir Francis Bernard, 1st Baronet
Berrien Township, Michigan – John M. Berrien
Berryville, Arkansas – Governor James H. Berry
Berthoud, Colorado – Edward L. Berthoud (railroad surveyor and engineer)
Bessemer, Alabama, Bessemer, Michigan, and Bessemer City, North Carolina – Henry Bessemer (English inventor of a steel making process)
Beveridge, California – John Beveridge
Beverly, West Virginia – William Beverly (landowner)
Bevier, Kentucky and Bevier, Missouri – Col. Robert Bevier
Bexar, 4 places in Alabama, Arkansas, Tennessee, and Texas (county) – Ferdinand VI of Spain (originally the Duke of Bexar)
Bieber, California – Nathan Bieber (early settler and first postmaster)
Bienville, Louisiana – Jean-Baptiste Le Moyne de Bienville
Billings, Montana – Frederick H. Billings
Billingsport, New Jersey – Edward Byllynge (merchant and colonial governor) (note the spelling)
Biltmore Forest, North Carolina – George Washington Vanderbilt II
Bingham, Maine – William Bingham (landowner)
Binghamton, New York – William Bingham
Birchville, California – L. Birch Adsit
Birdsall, New York – John Birdsall (judge)
Birdsboro, Pennsylvania – William Bird (landowner)
Bishop, California – Samuel Addison Bishop (settler) (indirectly, via Bishop Creek)
Bismarck, Missouri and Bismarck, North Dakota – Otto von Bismarck
Blacksburg, Virginia – William Black (landowner)
Blackstone, Massachusetts – Rev. William Blaxton (settler) (spelling variant)
Blackwells Corner, California – George Blackwell (merchant)
Bladenboro, North Carolina – Martin Bladen
Blaine, Maine – James G. Blaine
Blair, Nebraska – John Insley Blair (official of the Sioux City and Pacific Railroad)
Blairsden, California – James A. Blair (financier of the Western Pacific Railroad)
Blairstown, Iowa and Blairstown, New Jersey – John Insley Blair (railroad magnate and one of the 19th century's wealthiest men)
Blairsville, Pennsylvania – John Blair (resident)
Blakely, Georgia – Captain Johnston Blakeley, U.S. Navy
Blanchard, California – Rosie M. Blanchard (first postmaster)
Blanchard, Maine – Charles Blanchard (landowner)
Blanco, Monterey County, California – Tom White (settler); "Blanco" is "White" in Spanish
Blandford, Massachusetts – John Churchill, 1st Duke of Marlborough (also held the title Marquess of Blandford)
Blandville, Kentucky – Capt. Bland Ballard
Bleecker, New York – Rutger Jansen Bleecker (landowner)
Blissfield, Michigan – Henry Bliss (landowner)
Blocksburg, California – Benjamin Blockburger (merchant and founder)
Bloomfield, New Jersey – Governor Joseph Bloomfield
Blossburg, Pennsylvania – Aaron Bloss (settler)
Blountsville, Indiana – Andrew Blount (founder)
Blythe, California – Thomas Henry Blythe; San Francisco capitalist
Boardman, Ohio – Frederick Boardman (landowner)
Bodfish, California – George H. Bodfish (early settler)
Bodie, California – W.S. Bodey (prospector)
Boerne, Texas – Louis Boerne (German writer)
Bolivar, 4 places in Missouri, Mississippi, New York, and Tennessee – Simón Bolivar
Bolton, Massachusetts – Charles Powlett, 3rd Duke of Bolton
Bonaparte, Iowa – Napoleon Bonaparte
Bonds Corner, California – Dr. J.L. Bond (homesteader)
Bondurant, Iowa – A.C. Bondurant
Bonham, Texas – Col. J.B. Bonham
Bonner Springs, Kansas – Robert E. Bonner (editor of the New York Ledger)
Bonneville, Oregon – Benjamin Bonneville (explorer)
Booge, South Dakota – C.A. Booge
Boone, North Carolina, Boone Station, Kentucky, and Boonville, North Carolina – Daniel Boone
Boonville, California – W.W. Boone (merchant)
Boonton, New Jersey – Thomas Boone (colonial governor)
Boonville, New York – Gerrit Boon (land agent)
Borden, California – Dr. James Borden (civic leader)
Borden, Texas – Gail Borden (customs official)
Bordentown, New Jersey – Joseph Borden (founder)
Boscawen, New Hampshire – Lord Edward Boscawen
Bossier City, Louisiana – Pierre Bossier (general)
Bostic, North Carolina – George T. Bostic
Bottineau, North Dakota – Pierre Bottineau (settler)
Bouckville, New York – Governor William C. Bouck
Bourbon, Indiana – House of Bourbon
Bourne, Massachusetts – Jonathan Bourne Sr. (son of Richard Bourne, who served in the Massachusetts General Court)
Bowdoin, Maine – James Bowdoin (governor of Massachusetts)
Bowdoinham, Maine – William Bowdoin (landowner)
Bowerstown, New Jersey – Michael B. Bowers (iron foundry owner)
Bowie, Maryland – Colonel William D. Bowie
Bowie, Texas – James Bowie
Bowman, California – Harry Bowman (fruit grower)
Boyd, Kentucky – Lt. Governor Linn Boyd
Boylston, New York – Thomas Boylston (doctor)
Bozeman, Montana – John Bozeman
Braddock, Pennsylvania – Gen. Edward Braddock
Bradford County, Florida – Capt. Richard Bradford, first Confederate officer from Florida to die in the Civil War
Bradford, Pennsylvania – Attorney General William Bradford
Bradfordsville, Kentucky – Peter Bradford (settler)
Bradley, California – Bradley V. Sargent (landowner)
Bradley, Maine – Bradley Blackman (settler)
Bradley Beach, New Jersey – James A. Bradley (landowner)
Bradshaw City, Arizona – William D. Bradshaw
Bradys Bend, Pennsylvania – Capt. Samuel Brady
Bradtmoore, California – Bradley T. Moore (founder)
Brainerd, Kansas – E.B. Brainerd (landowner)
Brainerd, Minnesota – David Brainerd (missionary)
Brandon, Mississippi – Governor Gerard Brandon
Brant, New York – Joseph Brant
Brandt, South Dakota – Rev. P.O. Brandt
Branscomb, California – Benjamin Franklin Branscomb (early settler)
Brasher, New York – Philip Brasher (landowner)
Brattleboro, Vermont – Colonel William Brattle, Jr. (proprietor)
Breckenridge - John C. Breckinridge, 4 places in
Colorado - Minnesota - Missouri - Texas (all spelling variants)
Breedsville, Michigan – Silas Breed (settler)
Breese, Illinois – Lt. Governor Sidney Breese
Brevard County, Florida and Brevard, North Carolina – Ephraim J. Brevard (possible author of the Mecklenburg Declaration of Independence)
Brewer, Maine – Colonel John Brewer (settler)
Brewster, Massachusetts – Elder William Brewster
Brewster, Minnesota – Elder William Brewster (indirectly, via Brewster, Massachusetts)
Brewster, New York – Walter and James Brewster (two early farmer landowners)
Briceburg, California – William M. Brice (merchant)
Briceland, California – John C. Briceland (landowner)
Bricelyn, Minnesota – John Brice (landowner)
Bridger, Montana – Jim Bridger (frontiersman)
Bridgton, Maine – Moody Bridges (settler)
Briensburg, Kentucky – James Brien (state legislator)
Brigham City, Utah – Brigham Young
Briscoe, Texas – Andrew Briscoe (Texian patriot)
Bristol (village), Wisconsin – Rev. Ira Bristol (settler)
Broadus, Montana – Broaddus family (early settlers) (note spelling)
Brockport, New York – Hiel Brockway (settler)
Brockton, Massachusetts – Isaac Brock (British Army officer and administrator) (indirectly, after a local merchant heard of Brockville, Ontario, on a trip to Niagara Falls)
Brockway, California – Nathaniel Brockway (uncle of postmaster)
Broderick, California – U.S. Senator David C. Broderick
Bronson, Kansas – Ira D. Bronson (prominent resident of Fort Scott)
the Bronx, New York City – Jonas Bronck (settler)
Brooks, Maine – John Brooks (Federalist candidate for Governor of Massachusetts)
Brooks County, Georgia – Congressman Preston Brooks
Brooksville, Florida – Congressman Preston Brooks
Brookville, Indiana – Jesse Brook Thomas (proprietor)
Brown, California – George Brown (hotelier)
Brownfield, Maine – Captain Henry Young Brown (served in the French and Indian War)
Brownington, Vermont – Daniel and Timothy Brown (landholders)
Brownstown, Indiana, Brownsville, Kentucky, and Brownsville, Tennessee – Jacob Jennings Brown (American army officer)
Browns Valley, Minnesota – Joseph Brown (founder)
Brownsville, Maryland – Tobias Brown (early settler)
Brownsville, Pennsylvania – Thomas and Basil Brown (landowners)
Brownsville, Texas – Major Jacob Brown
Browntown, Wisconsin – William G. Brown (settler)
Brownville, Maine – Francis Brown (mill owner and trader)
Brownville, Nebraska – Richard Brown (settler)
Brownville, New York – John Brown (settler and father of General Jacob Jennings Brown)
Brownwood, Texas – Henry S. Brown (settler)
Bruceville, Indiana – William Bruce (landowner)
Brunswick, Maine – House of Brunswick
Brunswick, Vermont – from one of the titles for Prince Karl Wilhelm Ferdinand of Brunswick-Lunenburg
Brushton, New York – Henry N. Brush (landowner)
Brutus, 4 places in Kentucky, Michigan, New York, and Virginia – Marcus Junius Brutus
Bryan, Ohio – John A. Bryan (state auditor)
Bryan, Texas – William Joel Bryan
Bryson City, North Carolina – T.D. Bryson (state legislator and landowner)
Bryte, California – Mike Bryte (local farmer and landowner)
Buchanan, Michigan – James Buchanan
Buchanan, Virginia – John Buchanan (settler)
Buckfield, Maine – Abijah Buck (settler)
Buckner, Missouri – Senator Alexander Buckner or Real Estate operator Simon Buckner or namesake is Thomas W. Buckner, an original owner of the site.
Bucks Bridge, New York – Isaac Buck (settler)
Buckskin Joe, Park County, Colorado – Joseph Higginbotham (frontiersman nicknamed "Buckskin Joe")
Bucksport, California – David A. Buck (founder)
Bucksport, Maine – Colonel Jonathan Buck (grantee)
Bucoda, Washington – J.M. Buckley, Samuel Coulter, and John B. David (businessmen)
Buels Gore, Vermont – Major Elias Buel (landholder)
Bullittsville, Kentucky – Alexander Scott Bullitt
Bullochville, Georgia – Archibald Bulloch
Buna, Texas – Buna Corley (cousin of the Carroll family, prominent Beaumont lumbermen and industrialists)
Bunceton, Missouri – Harvey Bunce (resident)
Buntingville, California – A.J. Bunting (merchant)
Burbank, California – David Burbank (dentist)
Burden, Kansas – Robert F. Burden (landowner)
Burdell, California – Dr. Galen Burdell (dentist, landowner)
Bureau County, Illinois and Bureau Junction, Illinois – Pierre de Buero (trader) (note the spelling)
Burgaw, North Carolina – Burgaw family (residents)
Burke (town), New York and Burke, Vermont – Edmund Burke
Burleson, Texas – Edward Burleson (Texian patriot)
Burlingame, California - Anson Burlingame (abolitionist, legislator, diplomat)
Burlingame, Kansas – Anson Burlingame (abolitionist, legislator, diplomat)
Burlington, 5 places in Kansas, Iowa, Michigan, Vermont, and Wisconsin – Burling family (This family owned the land upon which the city in Vermont was built. The other cities derive their name from the Vermont one).
Burnet, Texas – Governor David G. Burnet
Burnsville, Indiana – Brice Bruns (founder)
Burnsville, North Carolina – Otway Burns (boat captain)
Burrel, California – Cuthbert Burrel (local rancher)
Burrillville, Rhode Island – James Burrill, Jr. (state attorney general and U.S. senator)
Burrton, Kansas – I.T. Burr (Vice President of the Atchison, Topeka and Santa Fe Railway)
Burson, California – David S. Burson (railroad man)
Bushnell, South Dakota – Frank E. Bushnell (landowner)
Busti, New York – Paolo Busti (landowner)
Butler, Missouri – General William O. Butler
Buxton, Oregon – Henry Buxton (settler)
Byers, Colorado – W.N. Byers (Denver resident)
Bynumville, Missouri – Dr. Joseph Bynum (settler)
Byron, 3 places in Georgia, Maine, and New York – Lord Byron (English poet)

C
Cable, Illinois – Ransom R. Cable (railroader)
Cabot, Vermont – named by settler Lyman Hitchcock for his intended bride
Cadillac, Michigan – Antoine de la Mothe Cadillac
Cadott, Wisconsin – Baptiste Cadotte (resident) (note the spelling)
Caldwell, Kansas – Alexander Caldwell (U.S. Senator)
Caldwell, New Jersey – Rev. James Caldwell
Caldwell, Ohio – Joseph and Samuel Caldwell (landowners)
Caldwell, Texas – Mathew Caldwell (Texian patriot)
Calhoun, Kentucky – John Calhoun (judge)
Callaway, Missouri – Capt. James Callaway
Callensburg, Pennsylvania – Hugh Callen (founder)
Calvert, Maryland – Cecil Calvert, 2nd Baron Baltimore
Camano Island, Washington – Jacinto Caamaño (explorer) (note the spelling)
Camden, 4 places in Maine, New Jersey, New York, and North Carolina – Charles Pratt, 1st Earl Camden
Cameron, 3 places in Louisiana, Pennsylvania, and West Virginia – Simon Cameron
Cameron, Missouri – Malinda Cameron (maiden name of wife of Samuel McCorkle, who platted the town of Somerville, Missouri)
Cameron, New York – Dugald Cameron (land agent)
Cameron, South Carolina – J. Donald Cameron (U.S. Senator from Pennsylvania)
Cameron, Texas – Ewen Cameron (Texian patriot)
Camillus, New York – Marcus Furius Camillus (Roman military leader)
Camp Connell, California – John F. Connell (landowner and first postmaster)
Camp Douglas, Wisconsin – James Douglas (established a camp along the Milwaukee Road to provide wood for the locomotives)
Camp Pardee, California – George Pardee (governor of California)
Camp Richardson, California – Alonzo L. Richardson (first postmaster)
Campbell, California – Benjamin Campbell (founder)
Campbell, New York – Campbell family (settlers)
Campbellsville, Kentucky – Andrew Campbell (founder)
Campion, Colorado – John F. Campion (hard rock mine owner and established the sugar beet industry)
Camptonville, California – Robert Campton (town blacksmith)
Canal Lewisville, Ohio – T.B. Lewis (founder)
Canby, California and Canby, Oregon – General Edward Canby
Canfield, Ohio – Jonathan Canfield (proprietor)
Cannonsburg, Michigan – Le Grand Cannon (resident of Troy, New York)
Cannonsville, New York – Benjamin Cannon (landowner)
Canonsburg, Pennsylvania – John Cannon (founder) (note the spelling)
Canova, South Dakota – Antonio Canova (Italian sculptor)
Canterbury, New Hampshire – William Wake, Archbishop of Canterbury
Capac, Michigan – Manco Cápac (Incan emperor)
Cape Elizabeth, Maine – Elizabeth of Bohemia (sister of King Charles I of England)
Cape Girardeau, Missouri – Jean Baptiste de Girardot (French soldier)
Cape May, New Jersey – Cornelius Jacobsen May (explorer)
Cape Vincent, New York – Vincent, son of Jacques-Donatien Le Ray de Chaumont
Captain Cook, Hawaii – Captain James Cook (English explorer)
Cardwell, Missouri – Frank Cardwell (resident of Paragould, Arkansas)
Caribou, California – Johnny Caribou (early miner)
Carlinville, Illinois – Governor Thomas Carlin
Carlisle, Massachusetts – Charles Howard, 1st Earl of Carlisle
Carlotta, California – Carlotta Vance (founder's daughter)
Carnegie, Pennsylvania – Andrew Carnegie
Carnesville, Georgia – Col. T.P. Carnes
Carolina, Rhode Island – Caroline Hazard (wife of Rowland G. Hazard, mill owner)
Carondelet, St. Louis, Missouri – Francisco Luis Héctor de Carondelet
Carol Stream, Illinois – (named for founder's daughter)
Carr, Colorado – Robert E. Carr (managed the construction of the Union Pacific Railroad rail line through the town)
Carroll, New Hampshire – Charles Carroll (a signer of the Declaration of Independence)
Carroll Plantation, Maine – Daniel Carroll (a signer of the U.S. Constitution)
Carrollton, New York – G. Carroll (landowner)
Carson City, Nevada – Kit Carson
Carson Hill, California – Sergeant James H. Carson
Carter, Kentucky – William G. Carter (state senator)
Carter, Tennessee – Gen. Landon Carter
Carteret, New Jersey – George Carteret (proprietor of New Jersey) and Philip Carteret (first royal governor of New Jersey)
Cartersville, Georgia – Col. F. Carter
Caruthers, California – W.A. Caruthers (local farmer)
Caruthersville, Missouri – Samuel Caruthers
Carver, Massachusetts – John Carver (first Governor of Plymouth Colony)
Carver, Minnesota – Capt. Jonathan Carver (explorer)
Cary, North Carolina – Samuel Fenton Cary (Prohibition advocate)
Caseyville, Kentucky – Col. William Casey
Cashion, Oklahoma – Roy Cashion (member of the Rough Riders)
Caspar, California – Siegfried Caspar (founder)
Casper, Wyoming – Lieutenant Caspar Collins (killed by a group of Indian warriors) (note spelling)
Casselton, North Dakota – Gen. George W. Cass (director of the Union Pacific Railroad)
Cassville, Wisconsin – Lewis Cass
Castine, Maine – Baron Jean-Vincent de St. Castin
Castroville, California – Simeon Nepomuceno Castro (landowner)
Castroville, Texas – Henri Castro (settler)
Catharine, New York – Catherine Montour (note the spelling)
Catheys Valley, California – Andrew Cathey (early settler)
Cato (town), New York – either Cato the Elder or Cato the Younger
Cavalier, North Dakota – Charles Cavalier (settler)
Cavendish, Vermont – William Cavendish, 4th Duke of Devonshire
Cawker City, Kansas – E.H. Cawker
Cazenovia, 4 places in Illinois, Minnesota, New York, and Wisconsin – Theophilus Cazenove (land agent) (The New York town is the original, and the others were named for it).
Cecilton, Maryland - Cecil Calvert, 2nd Baron Baltimore
Center Harbor, New Hampshire – Col. Joseph Senter (settler) (note the spelling)
Chadds Ford Township, Pennsylvania – Francis Chadsey (proprietor)
Chalfant Valley, California – Arthur Chalfant (newspaper publisher)
Chamberlain, South Dakota – Selah Chamberlain (railroad director)
Chambersburg, Pennsylvania – Benjamin Chambers (founder)
Chambers Lodge, California – David H. Chambers (lodge builder)
Champion, New York – Gen. Henry Champion (settler)
Champlain, New York – Samuel de Champlain
Chandler, Arizona – Dr. Alexander John Chandler
Chandlerville, Illinois – Dr. Charles Chandler (founder)
Chandler's Purchase, New Hampshire – Jeremiah Chanler (landowner) (note the spelling)
Chanute, Kansas – O. Chanute (engineer with the Leavenworth, Lawrence and Galveston Railroad)
Chaplin, Connecticut – Deacon Benjamin Chaplin (early settler)
Chapman, Pennsylvania – William Chapman (slate mine owner)
Chardon, Ohio – Peter Chardon Brooks (proprietor)
Charles Town, West Virginia – Charles Washington (founder; younger brother of George Washington)
Charleston, Maine – Charles Vaughan (settler)
Charleston, Mississippi – King Charles II of England (indirectly, via Charleston, South Carolina)
Charleston, South Carolina – King Charles II of England
Charleston, West Virginia – Charles Clendenin (father of Colonel George Clendenin, a landholder who built Fort Lee here)
Charlestown, New Hampshire – Admiral Sir Charles Knowles, 1st Baronet of the British Royal Navy
Charlestown, Rhode Island – King Charles II of England
Charlevoix, Michigan – Francis X. Charlevoix (missionary)
Charlotte, Maine – Charlotte Vance (wife of legislator William Vance)
Charlotte, New York and Charlottesville, Virginia – Princess Charlotte of Wales
Charlotte, North Carolina and Charlotte, Vermont – Charlotte of Mecklenburg-Strelitz (wife of King George III)
Charlton, Massachusetts – Sir Francis Charlton, 2nd Baronet
Chartiers Township, Pennsylvania – Peter Chartier (trader)
Chatfield, Minnesota – Judge Andrew Chatfield
Chatham, 4 places in Massachusetts, New Hampshire, New Jersey, and New York – William Pitt, 1st Earl of Chatham (Prime Minister of Great Britain)
Chaumont, New York – Jacques-Donatien Le Ray de Chaumont (proprietor)
Cheney, Kansas – P.B. Cheney (stockholder of the Atchison, Topeka and Santa Fe Railway)
Cheney, Washington – Benjamin P. Cheney (founder of the Northern Pacific Railway)
Cheneyville, Louisiana – William Cheney (settler)
Chester, Vermont – George IV of the United Kingdom, the Earl of Chester (eldest son of George III of the United Kingdom)
Chesterfield, Massachusetts and Chesterfield, New Hampshire – Philip Stanhope, 4th Earl of Chesterfield
Chichester, New Hampshire – Thomas Pelham-Holles, 1st Duke of Newcastle-upon-Tyne, Earl of Chichester
Childress, Texas – George Childress (Texian patriot)
Chittenden, Vermont – Thomas Chittenden (one of the Green Mountain Boys and later governor)
Chivington, Colorado – John Chivington (soldier and perpetrator of the Sand Creek massacre)
Choteau, Montana – Auguste and Pierre Chouteau (founders of St. Louis, Missouri) (note the spelling)
Christiana, Delaware and Christiana, Pennsylvania – Queen Christina of Sweden
Churchville, New York – Samuel Church (settler)
Cicero, Illinois – Cicero (indirectly, via Cicero, New York)
Cicero, New York – Cicero
Cincinnati, Ohio – Lucius Quinctius Cincinnatus (indirectly, via the Society of the Cincinnati)
Cincinnatus, New York – Lucius Quinctius Cincinnatus
Cisco, California – John J. Cisco (treasurer of the railroad)
Cisco Grove, California – John J. Cisco (treasurer of the railroad)
Clanton, Alabama – James Holt Clanton (Confederate general)
Clapper, Missouri – Henry Clapper (railroader)
Claraville, California – Clara Munckton (first white woman there)
Clarence, Missouri – Clarence Duff (son of John Duff, settler)
Clark Fork, Idaho – Governor William Clark
Clarkia, Idaho – Governor William Clark
Clarks, Nebraska – S.H.H. Clark (superintendent of the Union Pacific Railroad)
Clarksburg, California – Robert C. Clark (early settler)
Clarksburg, Massachusetts – Nicholas Clark (early settler)
Clarksburg, West Virginia – Gen. George Rogers Clark
Clarkston, Washington – Governor William Clark
Clarkesville, Georgia – Governor John Clarke
Clarksville, Indiana – Gen. George Rogers Clark
Clarksville, Missouri – Governor William Clark
Clarksville, New Hampshire – Benjamin Clark
Clarkton, Missouri – Henry E. Clark (contractor)
Clay, 4 places in Florida (county), Illinois, Indiana, and Kentucky – Henry Clay (United States Secretary of State in the 19th century)
Clayton, California – Joel Henry Clayton (founder)
Clayton, Delaware – Thomas Clayton (U.S. senator)
Clayton, Georgia – Augustin Smith Clayton (U.S. congressman)
Clayton, Missouri – Ralph Clayton
Clayton, New York and Clayton, North Carolina – John M. Clayton (U.S. Senator from Delaware)
Cleburne, Texas – Patrick Cleburne (Confederate general)
Clendenin, West Virginia – Charles Clendenin (father of Colonel George Clendenin)
Cleveland, North Carolina and Cleveland, Tennessee – Colonel Benjamin Cleveland
Cleveland, Ohio – Moses Cleaveland (note spelling)
Cleveland, Texas – Charles Lander Cleveland (local judge)
Cleveland, Manitowoc County, Wisconsin – Grover Cleveland
Clifford, Michigan – Clifford Lyman (first child born there)
Clinton – DeWitt Clinton, 16 places in
Arkansas – Connecticut – Illinois – Indiana – Iowa – Louisiana – Maine – Massachusetts – Michigan – Minnesota – Mississippi – Missouri – New Jersey – New York (city and county) – Ohio – Wisconsin
Clinton, Kansas – DeWitt Clinton (indirectly, via Clinton, Illinois)
Clinton, Montana – General Sir Henry Clinton
Clinton, Nebraska – DeWitt Clinton (indirectly, via Clinton, Iowa)
Clinton, Dutchess County, New York – George Clinton (early governor of New York)
Clinton, Oneida County, New York – George Clinton (early governor of New York)
Clinton, North Carolina – American Revolution General Richard Clinton
Clinton, Oklahoma – Clinton Irwin (territorial judge)
Clinton, South Carolina – Henry Clinton Young (Laurens lawyer who helped lay out the first streets)
Clinton, Washington – DeWitt Clinton (indirectly, via Clinton, Lenawee County, Michigan)
Clockville, New York – John Klock (landowner) (note the spelling)
Clovis, California – Clovis Cole (local farmer)
Clymers, Indiana – George Clymer (founder)
Clymer, New York – George Clymer (signer of the Declaration of Independence)
Coatesville, Pennsylvania – Moses Coates (settler)
Cochran, Georgia – Arthur E. Cochran (judge)
Cockeysville, Maryland – Thomas Cockey (settler)
Coeymans, New York – Barent Peterse Coeymans (landowner)
Coffeeville, Mississippi – Gen. John Coffee
Coffeyville, Kansas – A.M. Coffey (state legislator)
Cokesbury, South Carolina – Bishops Thomas Coke and Francis Asbury
Colby, Kansas – J.R. Colby (settler)
Colby, Wisconsin – Charles Colby (president of the Wisconsin Central Railroad)
Colchester, Vermont – Earl of Colchester
Colden, New York – Cadwallader D. Colden (state legislator)
Colebrook, New Hampshire – Sir George Colebrooke (landowner) (note the spelling)
Coleman, Texas – R.M. Coleman (Texas Ranger)
Coleville, California – Cornelius Cole (US Senator)
Colesville, New York – Nathaniel Cole (settler)
Colfax, 5 places in California, Indiana, Louisiana, Michigan, and Washington – Schuyler Colfax (US Vice President)
Collettsville, North Carolina – Colletts family (residents)
Collier County, Florida – Barron Collier
Collinsville, Illinois – Collins brothers (founders)
Colrain, Massachusetts – Lord Coleraine (note spelling)
Colquitt, Georgia and Colquitt County, Georgia – U.S. Senator Walter T. Colquitt
Colton, New York – Jesse Colton Higley (settler)
Columbia, South Carolina – Christopher Columbus
Columbus, Georgia and Columbus, Ohio – Christopher Columbus (Italian explorer)
Communipaw, New Jersey – Michael Reyniersz Pauw (director of the Dutch West India Company) (note the spelling)
Compton, California – Griffith D. Compton (settler)
Conklin, New York – Judge John Conklin
Connellsville, Pennsylvania – Zachariah Connell (founder)
Connersville, Indiana – John Conner (founder)
Connersville, Kentucky – Lewis Conner
Conroe, Texas – Isaac Conroe (Union Cavalry officer)
Constable, New York and Constableville, New York – William Constable (proprietor) 
Conway, Arkansas – Henry Wharton Conway (territorial delegate to Congress)
Conway, Massachusetts and Conway, New Hampshire – General Henry Seymour Conway (Commander in Chief of the British Army)
Conway, South Carolina – Gen. Robert Conway (resident)
Cooksburg, New York – Thomas B. Cook (landowner)
Coolidge, Kansas – Thomas Jefferson Coolidge (president of the Atchison, Topeka and Santa Fe Railway)
Coolidge, Arizona – named for 30th President of the United States Calvin Coolidge and the most recent city to be named after a U.S. President
Cooper, Maine – General John Cooper (landowner)
Cooper River (South Carolina) – Anthony Ashley Cooper, 1st Earl of Shaftesbury
Cooperstown, New York – William Cooper
Cooperstown, Pennsylvania – William Cooper (founder)
Coopersville, Clinton County, New York – Ebenezer Cooper (mill owner)
Cope, Colorado – Jonathan Cope (founder)
Cope, South Carolina – J. Martin Cope (founder)
Coraopolis, Pennsylvania – Cora Watson (wife of landowner)
Corbett, Oregon – U.S. Senator Henry W. Corbett 
Corinna, Maine – Corinna Warren (daughter of Dr. John Warren, landowner)
Corinne, Utah – Corinne Williamson (daughter of General J.A. Williamson)
Cornelius, Oregon – Col. Thomas R. Cornelius
Cornettsville, Indiana – Myer and Samuel Cornett (founders)
Corning (city), New York and Corning, Kansas – Erastus Corning (politician)
Cornish, New Hampshire – Vice-Admiral Samuel Cornish of the British Royal Navy
Cornplanter Township, Venango County, Pennsylvania – Cornplanter (Native American chief)
Coronado, California and Coronado, Kansas – Francisco Vázquez de Coronado (explorer)
Corpus Christi, Texas – Jesus Christ (Body of Christ)
Corrigan, Texas – Pat Corrigan (train conductor)
Corry, Pennsylvania – Hiram Corry (landowner)
Corsicana, Texas – Corcisana Navarro (wife of landowner)
Cortland, New York, Cortlandt, New York, and Cortlandville, New York – Pierre Van Cortlandt (first Lieutenant Governor of New York)
Corwin, Ohio – Thomas Corwin (Governor and U.S. Senator)
Cottleville, Missouri – Lorenzo Cottle (settler)
Cottrell Key, Florida – Jeremiah Cottrell (lighthouse keeper)
Coulter, Pennsylvania – Eli Coulter (settler)
Coulterville, California – George W. Coulter (early settler)
Coupeville, Washington – Captain Thomas Coupe (founder)
Courtland, Kansas – Pierre Van Cortlandt (indirectly, via Cortland, New York) (note the spelling)
Coutolenc, California – Eugene Coutolenc (early merchant)
Covington, 3 places in Georgia, Kentucky, and New York – Gen. Leonard Covington
Cowell, California – Joshua Cowell (landowner)
Cowles, Nebraska – W.D. Cowles (railroader)
Cozad, Nebraska – John J. Cozad (landowner)
Crabtree, California – John F. Crabtree (homesteader)
Crabtree, Oregon – John J. Crabtree (settler)
Craftsbury, Vermont – Ebenezer Crafts (landholder)
Craig, Colorado – Rev. Bayard Craig
Cranesville, Pennsylvania – Fowler Crane (founder)
Crannell, California – Levi Crannell (lumber company president)
Cranston, Rhode Island – Gov. Samuel Cranston
Crawford, Georgia and Crawford, Maine – William H. Crawford (U.S. Senator, Secretary of War, and Secretary of the Treasury)
Crawford's Purchase, New Hampshire – Ethan A. Crawford (landowner)
Crawfordsville, Indiana – William H. Crawford (U.S. Senator, Secretary of War, and Secretary of the Treasury)
Crawfordsville, Oregon – George F. Crawford (settler)
Crawfordville, Georgia – William H. Crawford (U.S. Senator, Secretary of War, and Secretary of the Treasury)
Cresson, Pennsylvania and Cressona, Pennsylvania – Elliott Cresson (Philadelphia merchant)
Cressey, California – Calvin J. Cressey (landowner)
Creswell, North Carolina – Postmaster General John Creswell
Crittenden, Kentucky – U.S. Senator John J. Crittenden
Crockett, California – Joseph B. Crockett (California Supreme Court judge)
Crockett, Texas – Davy Crockett
Croghan (town), New York – Col. George Croghan
Crook, Colorado – General George Crook (officer during the Civil War and the Indian Wars)
Crosbyton, Texas – Stephen Crosby (land office commissioner)
Croswell, Michigan – Gov. Charles Croswell
Crowley, Polk County, Oregon – Solomon K. Crowley (settler)
Crugers, New York – Col. John P. Cruger
Cudahy, California – Michael Cudahy
Cudahy, Wisconsin – Patrick Cudahy (meatpacker)
Cullman, Alabama – Gen. John G. Cullmann (note the spelling)
Culloden, Georgia – William Culloden (settler)
Cullom, Illinois – Shelby Moore Cullom (U.S. Senator)
Culpeper, Virginia – Thomas Colepeper, 2nd Baron Colepeper (note the spelling)
Cumberland, Maryland and Cumberland, Rhode Island – Prince William, Duke of Cumberland
Cumming, Georgia – Col. William Cumming
Cummings, Mendocino County, California – Jonathan Cummings (early settler)
Cummington, Massachusetts – Colonel John Cummings (landholder)
Cumminsville, Nebraska – J.F. Cummings (county clerk) (note the spelling)
Cumminsville, Ohio – David Cummins (settler)
Cupertino, California – Joseph of Cupertino
Curry Village, California – David A. Curry (founder)
Curryville, Missouri – Perry Curry (founder)
Curwensville, Pennsylvania – John Curwen
Cushing, Maine – Thomas Cushing (statesman and lieutenant governor of Massachusetts)
Custer, 5 places in Colorado, Idaho, Montana, Nebraska, and South Dakota – Gen. George Armstrong Custer
Cuthbert, Georgia – Col. John Alfred Cuthbert (congressman)
Cutler, Maine – Joseph Cutler (settler)
Cynthiana, Kentucky – Cynthia and Anna Harris (daughters of landowner)

D
Dacono, Colorado – Daisy Baum, Cora Van Vorhies and Nona (or Nora) Brooks (local residents)
Dade City, Florida – Major Francis L. Dade
Dadeville, Alabama – Major Francis L. Dade
Daggett, Indiana – Charles Daggett (resident)
Dagsboro, Delaware – Sir John Dagworthy
Daisetta, Texas – Daisy Barrett and Etta White (early residents)
Dallas, North Carolina and Dallas, Texas – George M. Dallas
Dallas Center, Iowa – George M. Dallas
Dalton, Massachusetts and Dalton, New Hampshire – Tristram Dalton (Speaker of the Massachusetts House of Representatives)
Dalton, Missouri – William Dalton
Dandridge, Tennessee – Martha Washington (née Dandridge)
Danforth, Maine – Thomas Danforth (proprietor)
Danielsville, Georgia – Gen. Allen Daniel Jr.
Dansville, Michigan – Daniel L. Crossman (resident)
Dansville, Livingston County, New York and Dansville, Steuben County, New York – Daniel P. Faulkner (founder)
Danvers, Massachusetts – Danvers Osborn family
Danville, California – Daniel Inman (local landowner)
Danville, Georgia – Daniel G. Hughes (father of U.S. Representative Dudley Mays Hughes)
Danville, Indiana – Daniel Bales (proprietor)
Danville, Kentucky – Walker Daniel (founder)
Danville, Missouri – Daniel M. Boone (landowner and son of Daniel Boone)
Danville, Pennsylvania – Gen. Daniel Montgomery Jr.
Danville, Vermont – Jean-Baptiste Bourguignon d'Anville
Darkesville, West Virginia – Gen. William Darke
Darlington, Pennsylvania – S.P. Darlington (Pittsburgh merchant)
Darrah, California – Richard Darrah (first postmaster)
Darwin, California – Dr. Darwin French
Darwin, Illinois – Charles Darwin
Daulton, California – Henry C. Daulton (landowner and politician)
Davenport, Iowa – Colonel George Davenport
Davenport, Nebraska – Colonel George Davenport (indirectly, via Davenport, Iowa)
Davenport, New York – John Davenport (settler)
Davidson, North Carolina – Gen. William Lee Davidson
Davie, Florida – Randolph P. Davie (developer)
Davis, California – Jerome C. Davis (local farmer)
Davis, West Virginia – Henry Gassaway Davis (U.S. Senator)
Dawson, Illinois – John Dawson (member of "The Long Nine", a group of legislators from Sangamon County)
Dawson, Nebraska – Joshua Dawson (settler)
Dawsonville, Georgia – William Crosby Dawson (U.S. Senator)
Dayton, Maine and Dayton, Ohio – Jonathan Dayton
Dayton, Texas – I. C. Day (landowner) (combination of Day's Town)
Daytona Beach, Florida – Matthias Day
Dearborn, Michigan and Dearborn, Missouri – Henry Dearborn (Revolutionary War general and Secretary of War)
Deblois, Maine – T.A. Deblois (president of the Bank of Portland)
Decatur, 4 places in Georgia, Illinois, Mississippi, and New York – Stephen Decatur (War of 1812 naval hero)
Decatur, Nebraska – Stephen Decatur (one of the village's incorporators)
Decorah, Iowa – Decorie (Native American chief)
Decoto, California – Ezra Decoto (landowner)
Deering, New Hampshire – Frances Deering Wentworth (the maiden name of Governor John Wentworth's wife)
Delancey, New York – James De Lancey (landowner)
DeLand, Florida – Henry Addison DeLand (founder, also founded Stetson University)
Delano, California – Columbus Delano
Delavan, Wisconsin – Edward C. Delavan (temperance leader in Albany, New York)
Delaware – Thomas West, 3rd Baron De La Warr (note the spelling)
De Leon, Texas and DeLeon Springs, Florida – Juan Ponce de León
Denison, Iowa – J.W. Denison (founder)
Denison, Texas – Rev. C.W. Denison (abolitionist)
Denmark, South Carolina – B.A. Denmark (railroader)
Denning, New York – William Denning (land purchaser)
Dennis, Massachusetts – Josiah Dennis (resident minister)
Dennison, Ohio – Gov. William Dennison Jr.
Denton, Texas – Capt. John B. Denton
Denver, Colorado – James W. Denver
Depauville, New York – Francis Depau (proprietor)
Depew, New York – Chauncey Depew
De Peyster, New York – Frederic de Peyster
DeSabla, California – Eugene De Sabla (engineer)
De Smet, Idaho and De Smet, South Dakota – Pierre-Jean De Smet (missionary)
DeSoto, 4 places in Florida (county), Georgia, Louisiana (parish), and Mississippi (county) – Hernando de Soto
Devens, Massachusetts – Charles Devens (Civil War general and jurist)
Devine, Texas – Thomas J. Devine (prominent resident of San Antonio)
Dewees, Texas –  Thomas Dewees and John O. Dewees, Texas cattlemen
Deweyville, Texas – Admiral George Dewey (victorious in the Battle of Manila Bay)
DeWitt, Illinois and De Witt, Missouri – DeWitt Clinton (governor of New York)
DeWitt, New York – Major Moses DeWitt (judge and soldier)
Dexter, Maine – Samuel Dexter (early statesman)
Dexter, Michigan – Samuel W. Dexter (settler)
Dexter, Minnesota – Dexter Parrity (early settler)
Dexter, New York – S. Newton Dexter (businessman from Whitesboro, New York)
D'Hanis, Texas – William D'Hanis (land agent for Henri Castro)
Di Giorgio, California – Joseph Di Giorgio (agricultural entrepreneur)
Diamondville, California – James Diamond
Dickey, North Dakota – George H. Dickey (state legislator)
Dickinson, North Dakota – W.S. Dickinson (founder)
Dickson, Tennessee – William Dickson
Dighton, Kansas – Francis Deighton (surveyor) (note the spelling)
Dighton, Massachusetts – Frances Dighton Williams (wife of Richard Williams, town elder)
Diller, Nebraska – H.H. Diller (settler)
Dillon, Montana – Sidney Dillon (railroader)
Dillon Beach, California – George Dillon (founder)
Dillsboro, Indiana – Gen. James Dill (settler)
Dillsboro, North Carolina – George W. Dill (settler)
Dimond, California – Hugh Dimond (Gold Rush miner and landowner)
Dinwiddie, Virginia – Robert Dinwiddie (colonial governor)
District of Columbia – Christopher Columbus
Dixfield, Maine and Dixmont, Maine – Dr. Elijah Dix (landowner)
Dixon, California – Thomas Dickson (donor of land for a railroad depot) (error in the address of the first rail shipment to here [Dicksonville] stuck)
Dixon, Illinois – John Dixon (founder)
Dixon, Kentucky – Archibald Dixon
Dixville, New Hampshire – Timothy Dix, Jr. (grantee)
Dobbins, California – William M. and Mark D. Dobbins (early settlers)
Dobson, North Carolina – W.P. Dobson (state legislator)
Dodge Center, Minnesota and Dodgeville, Wisconsin – Gov. Henry Dodge
Dolph, Oregon – Joseph N. Dolph (U.S. Senator)
Donaldsonville, Louisiana – William Donaldson
Doniphan, 3 places in Kansas, Missouri, and Nebraska – Col. Alexander William Doniphan
Donner, California – Donner Party (ill-fated emigrant group)
Doral, Florida – Alfred Kaskel and his wife Doris Bernstein (1906–1988)
Dormansville, New York – Daniel Dorman (innkeeper)
Dougherty, California – James Witt Dougherty (founder)
Douglas, Massachusetts – Dr. William Douglas (Boston physician)
Douglas, Wyoming – Stephen A. Douglas
Douglas Flat, California – Tom Douglas (early merchant)
Douglass, Kansas – Joseph Douglass (founder)
Dover-Foxcroft, Maine – Joseph E. Foxcroft (proprietor)
Downers Grove, Illinois – Pierce Downer (settler)
Downey, California – John G. Downey
Downingtown, Pennsylvania – Thomas Downing
Downs, Kansas – William F. Downs (Atchison resident)
Downsville, New York – Abel Downs (tanner)
Doyle, Lassen County, California – Oscar Doyle (landowner)
Doylestown, Ohio – William Doyle
Doylestown, Pennsylvania – William Doyle (settler)
Drakesbad, California – Edward R. Drake (settler and lodge owner)
Drakesville, Iowa – John A. Drake (founder)
Dresbach Township, Minnesota – George B. Dresbach (founder)
Drewry's Bluff, Virginia – Maj. Augustus Drewry
Dryden, New York – John Dryden
Duane, New York and Duanesburg, New York – James Duane (grantee)
DuBois, Pennsylvania – John Dubois (founder)
Dubuque, Iowa – Julien Dubuque (early resident)
Dudley, Georgia – Dudley Mays Hughes (U.S. Representative)
Dudley, Massachusetts – Paul and William Dudley (landowners)
Duluth, Georgia – Daniel Greysolon, Sieur du Lhut (indirectly, via Duluth, Minnesota)
Duluth, Minnesota – Daniel Greysolon, Sieur du Lhut
Dummer, New Hampshire and Dummerston, Vermont – William Dummer (Massachusetts Governor)
Dumont, Colorado – John M. Dumont (mine operator)
Dunbar, Nebraska – John Dunbar (landowner)
Duncombe, Iowa – J.F. Duncombe
Dunlap, California – George Dunlap Moss (teacher)
Dunlap, Kansas – Joseph Dunlap (trader and founder)
Dunlapsville, Indiana – John Dunlap (settler)
Dunmore, West Virginia – John Murray, 4th Earl of Dunmore (colonial governor)
Dunnigan, California – A. W. Dunnigan (early settler)
Dunnsville, New York – Christopher Dunn (landowner)
Duplin County, North Carolina – Thomas Hay, Viscount Dupplin
Duquesne, Pennsylvania – Michel-Ange Duquesne de Menneville (indirectly, via Fort Duquesne)
Durand, Michigan – George H. Durand (U.S. Representative)
Durand, Wisconsin – Miles Durand Prindle (settler)
Durant, Iowa – Thomas Durant
Durham, California – W.W. Durham (member of the California State Assembly)
Durham, North Carolina – Bartlett S. Durham (landowner)
Duval County, Florida – William Pope DuVal, Governor of Florida Territory from 1822 to 1834
Dycusburg, Kentucky – William E. Dycus (founder)
Dyersburg, Tennessee – Col. Henry Dyer
Dyersville, Iowa – James Dyer (landowner)

E
Earling, Iowa – Albert J. Earling, Milwaukee Road officer
Earl Park, Indiana – Adams Earl (founder)
Earlville, Iowa – G.M. Earl (settler)
Earlville, New York – Jonas Earll Jr. (canal commissioner) (note the spelling)
East Fallowfield Township, Crawford County, Pennsylvania – Lancelot Fallowfield (landowner)
Eastland, Texas – M.W. Eastland
Eastman, Georgia – W.P. Eastman
Easton, Massachusetts – John Easton (colonial governor of Rhode Island)
East St. Louis, Illinois – Saint Louis
Eaton, Colorado – Benjamin H. and Aaron J. Eaton (millers)
Eaton, New Hampshire – Connecticut Governor Theophilus Eaton
Eaton, New York and Eaton, Ohio – Gen. William Eaton
Eatonton, Georgia – Gen. William Eaton
Ebensburg, Pennsylvania – Eben Lloyd (died in childhood)
Eckley, California – Commodore John L. Eckley
Eckley, Colorado – Amos Eckles (cattlehand)
Eddington, Maine – Colonel Jonathan Eddy (officer in the American Revolution)
Eddyville, Iowa – J.P. Eddy (postmaster)
Eden, Texas – Fred Ede (landowner)
Edgartown, Massachusetts – Edgar Stuart, Duke of Cambridge
Edgecomb, Maine – George Edgcumbe, 1st Earl of Mount Edgcumbe (a supporter of the colonists) (note the spelling)
Edgerton, Ohio – Alfred Peck Edgerton
Edgerton, Wisconsin – E.W. Edgerton (settler)
Edison, 3 places in Georgia, New Jersey, and Ohio – Thomas Edison
Edmeston, New York – Robert Edmeston (founder)
Edna, Kansas – Edna Gragery (child who lived there)
Edroy, Texas – Ed Cubage and Roy Miller (co-founders)
Edwards, Mississippi – Dick Edwards (Jackson hotelier)
Edwards, New York – Edward McCormack (founder's brother)
Edwardsport, Indiana – Edwards Wilkins
Edwardsville, Illinois – Ninian Edwards (territorial governor)
Effingham, Illinois and Effingham County, Illinois – Gen. Edward Effingham
Effingham, Kansas – Effingham Nichols (railroader)
Effingham, New Hampshire – Howard family, who were Earls of Effingham
Egremont, Massachusetts – Charles Wyndham, 2nd Earl of Egremont
Ehrenberg, Arizona – Herman Ehrenberg (founder)
El Macero, California – Bruce Mace (local landowner)
Elberton, Georgia and Elbert County, Georgia – Gov. Samuel Elbert
Elbridge, New York – Elbridge Gerry
Elizabeth, New Jersey and Elizabethtown, North Carolina – Lady Elizabeth Carteret (wife of colonial proprietor and statesman George Carteret)
Elizabeth, Pennsylvania – Elizabeth Bayard (founder's wife)
Elizabeth, West Virginia – Elizabeth Beauchamp
Elizabeth City, North Carolina – Elizabeth I
Elizabethton, Tennessee – Elizabeth MacLin Carter and Elizabeth McNabb (wives of two early settlers)
Elizabethtown, Indiana – Elizabeth Branham (founder's wife)
Elizabethtown, Kentucky – Elizabeth Hynes (wife of early settler Andrew Hynes)
Elkader, Iowa – Abd el-Kader (Algerian patriot)
Elkins, West Virginia – Stephen Benton Elkins (U.S. Senator)
Ellenburg, New York – Ellen Murray (landowner's daughter)
Ellendale, Delaware – Ellen Prettyman (founder's wife)
Ellensburg, Washington – Mary Ellen Shoudy (wife of John A. Shoudy, purchaser of local trading post and founder)
Ellenville, New York – Ellen Snyder (settler)
Ellery, New York – William Ellery
Ellicott, New York and Ellicottville, New York – Joseph Ellicott (agent of the Holland Land Company)
Ellicott City, Maryland – John, Andrew, and Joseph Ellicott (founders)
Ellinwood, Kansas – Col. John R. Ellinwood (engineer for the Atchison, Topeka and Santa Fe Railway)
Ellisburg, New York – Lyman Ellis (founder)
Ellisville, Mississippi – Powhatan Ellis (U.S. Senator)
Ellsworth, Kansas – Lt. Allen Ellsworth
Ellsworth, Maine and Ellsworth, New Hampshire – Chief Justice Oliver Ellsworth
Elmendorf, Texas – Henry Elmendorf (mayor of San Antonio)
Elmira, New York – Elmira Teall (tavernkeeper's daughter)
Elmore, Vermont – Colonel Samuel Elmore (landowner)
Elsie, Michigan – Elsie Tillotson (pioneer's daughter)
Elsie, Nebraska – Elsie Perkins
Elyria, Ohio – Heman Ely (1817)
Emerick, Nebraska – John Emerick (settler)
Emery, South Dakota – S.M. Emery (landowner)
Emeryville, California – Joseph Stickney Emery (local landowner)
Emlenton, Pennsylvania – Emlen Fox (landowner's wife)
Emmett, Michigan and Emmetsburg, Iowa – Robert Emmet (Irish nationalist)
Emmitsburg, Maryland – William Emmitt (founder) (note the spelling)
Enfield, Massachusetts – Robert Field
Ennis, Montana – William Ennis (settler)
Enosburgh, Vermont – Roger Enos (landowner)
Errol, New Hampshire – James Hay, 15th Earl of Erroll
Erving, Massachusetts – John Erving (early farmer landowner)
Erwin, New York – Col. Arthur Erwin
Eskridge, Kansas – C.V. Eskridge (landowner)
Essexville, Michigan – Ransom Essex (settler)
Estes Park, Colorado – Joel Estes (founder)
Estherville, Iowa – Esther Ridley (landowner's wife)
Estill, Kentucky – Capt. James Estill
Estill, Missouri – Col. John R. Estill
Ethel, Mississippi – Ethel McConnico
Euclid, Ohio – Euclid (Greek mathematician)
Eudora, Kansas – Eudora Fish
Eugene, Oregon – Eugene Franklin Skinner (settler)
Eunice, Louisiana – Eunice Pharr Duson (second wife of Curley Duson, the founder of the city)
Eustis, Maine – Charles L. Eustis (early proprietor)
Evans, Colorado, Evanston, Illinois, and Evanston, Wyoming – Gov. John Evans
Evans, New York – David Ellicott Evans (agent of the Holland Land Company)
Evans Mills, New York – Ethni Evans (mill owner)
Evansville, Indiana – Robert Morgan Evans (founder)
Evansville, Wyoming – W.T. Evans (blacksmith)
Evart, Michigan – Frank Evart (pioneer)
Everett, Massachusetts and Everett, Pennsylvania – Edward Everett (politician and educator)
Everett, Washington – Everett Colby (son of Charles Colby, local booster)
Ewing Township, New Jersey – Charles Ewing (Chief Justice of the New Jersey Supreme Court)

F

Fairbanks, Alaska – Charles W. Fairbanks
Fairfax, California – Charles S. Fairfax
Fairfax, Virginia and Fairfax County, Virginia – Thomas Fairfax, 6th Lord Fairfax of Cameron
Fallon, California – Luke and James Fallon (early settlers)
Fallowfield, Pennsylvania – Lancelot Fallowfield (landowner)
Fannin, Texas – Col. James Fannin (Texian patriot)
Fannett, Texas – B. J. Fannett (local landowner who opened a general store there in the 1890s)
Fargo, North Dakota – William Fargo
Faribault, Minnesota – Jean-Baptiste Faribault (settler)
Farley, Mendocino County, California – Jackson Farley (early settler)
Farnham, New York – Le Roy Farnham (merchant)
Farragut, Iowa and Farragut, Tennessee – David Farragut
Farrandsville, Pennsylvania – William P. Farrand (founder)
Farwell, Michigan – Samuel B. Farwell (railroader)
Fayette, 12 places in Alabama, Indiana, Iowa, Maine, Michigan, Mississippi, Missouri, New York, Ohio, Utah, West Virginia, and Wisconsin – Gilbert du Motier, marquis de La Fayette
Fayetteville, 11 places in Arkansas, Georgia, Illinois, Indiana, New York, North Carolina, Ohio, Pennsylvania, Tennessee, Texas, and West Virginia – Gilbert du Motier, marquis de La Fayette
Fayette City, Pennsylvania – Gilbert du Motier, marquis de La Fayette
Felix Township, Grundy County, Illinois and Felix Township, Grundy County, Iowa – Felix Grundy (U.S. Senator from Tennessee)
Fellows, California – Charles A. Fellows (railroad contractor)
Fell's Point, Baltimore, Maryland – William Fell (landowner)
Felts Mills, New York – John Felt (proprietor)
Fenner, New York – Rhode Island Governor Arthur Fenner
Fennville, Michigan – Ethan Fenn (founder)
Fenton, New York – Governor Reuben Fenton
Ferdinand, Vermont – from one of the titles for Prince Karl Wilhelm Ferdinand of Brunswick-Lunenburg
Fernandina Beach, Florida – King Ferdinand VII of Spain
Ferrisburgh, Vermont – Benjamin Ferris (founder)
Fields Landing, California – Waterman Field (early settler)
Fieldville, New Jersey – John Field (early settler)
Fincastle, Virginia – George Murray, 5th Earl of Dunmore (son of colonial governor Lord Dunmore and also known by the title Lord Fincastle)
Findlay, Ohio – Col. James Findlay (indirectly, via Fort Findlay)
Findlay Township, Allegheny County, Pennsylvania – Gov. William Findley (note the spelling)
Fine, New York – John Fine (landowner)
Finley, California – Samuel Finley Sylar (early settler)
Firebaugh, California – Andrew D. Firebaugh
Firestone, Colorado – Jacob Firestone (landowner)
Fitchburg, Massachusetts – John Fitch (settler)
Fithian, Illinois – Dr. William Fithian
Fitzwilliam, New Hampshire – William Fitzwilliam, 4th Earl Fitzwilliam (cousin of Governor John Wentworth)
Flagler County, Florida – Henry Flagler, built the Florida East Coast Railway
Flandreau, South Dakota – Charles Eugene Flandrau
Fleming, New York – Gen. George Fleming (resident)
Flemingsburg, Kentucky – Col. John Fleming
Flora, Mississippi – Flora Jones (resident)
Florence, Kansas – Florence Crawford
Florence, Kentucky – Florence Conner (wife of early settler)
Florence, Omaha, Nebraska – Florence Kilbourn
Florence, South Carolina – Florence Hartlee (daughter of a railroad president who lived in the area)
Floresville, Texas – Don Francisco Flores de Abrego (early settler)
Floyd, Iowa – Charles Floyd (explorer with Lewis and Clark)
Floyd, New York – William Floyd (Founding Father)
Floyd, Virginia – John Floyd (Virginia politician)
Floydada, Texas – Dolphin Floyd (died while defending the Alamo) and Ada Price (wife of a local landholder) (indirectly, via Floyd County, Texas)
Fluhr, California – C.G. Fluhr (railroad official)
Fonda, New York – Douw Fonda
Forbestown, California – B.F. Forbes (local store owner)
Ford, Kansas – Col. James Hobart Ford
Forsyth, Georgia – Gov. John Forsyth
Forsyth, Montana – General James W. Forsyth
Fort Atkinson, Wisconsin – Gen. Henry Atkinson
Fort Benton, Montana – Thomas Hart Benton
Fort Bragg, California - American Army officer and Confederate general Braxton Bragg
Fort Collins, Colorado – Colonel William O. Collins
Fort Covington, New York – Gen. Leonard Covington
Fort Dodge, Iowa – Henry Dodge (U.S. senator from Wisconsin) (indirectly, after the fort named after him)
Fort Edward (town), New York – Prince Edward, Duke of York and Albany
Fort Fairfield, Maine – Gov. John Fairfield
Fort Fetterman, Wyoming – Lt. Col. William J. Fetterman
Fort Frederica, Georgia – Frederick, Prince of Wales
Fort Gaines, Alabama and Fort Gaines, Georgia – Gen. Edmund P. Gaines
Fort Hamilton, New York – Alexander Hamilton
Fort John, California – John Stuart
Fort Johnston, North Carolina – Gabriel Johnston, 6th Governor of North Carolina
Fort Kent, Maine – Edward Kent (governor of Maine)
Fort Lauderdale, Florida – Major William Lauderdale
Fort Leavenworth, Kansas – Gen. Henry Leavenworth
Fort Lee, New Jersey – Charles Lee
Fort Lupton, Colorado – Lieutenant Lancaster Lupton (built a trading post here)
Fort Madison, Iowa – James Madison
Fort Morgan, Colorado – Colonel Christopher A. Morgan
Fort Myers, Florida and Fort Myers Beach, Florida – Col. Abraham C. Myers
Fort Pierre, South Dakota – Pierre Chouteau Jr.
Fort Romie, California – Charles Romie (landowner)
Fort Scott, Kansas – Gen. Winfield Scott
Fort Seward, California – William H. Seward
Fort Sheridan, Illinois – Gen. Philip Sheridan
Fort Wayne, Indiana – Anthony Wayne
Fort Worth, Texas – William Jenkins Worth
Foster, Rhode Island – U.S. Senator Theodore Foster
Fostoria, Ohio – Gov. Charles Foster
Fouts Springs, California – John F. Fouts (discoverer of the springs)
Fowler, California – Thomas Fowler (California State Senator)
Fowler, Michigan – John N. Fowler
Fowler, New York – Theodocius Fowler (landowner)
Fowlerville, Michigan – Ralph Fowler (settler)
Fowlerville, Livingston County, New York – Wells Fowler (settler)
Foxburg, Pennsylvania – H.M. Fox (landowner)
Foxborough, Massachusetts – Charles James Fox
Francestown, New Hampshire – Frances Deering Wentworth (Governor John Wentworth's wife)
Franceville, Colorado – Matt France
Frankfort, Kansas – Frank Schmidt (landowner)
Frankfort, Kentucky – Benjamin Franklin
Frankfort (town), New York – Lawrence Frank (settler)
Franklin – Benjamin Franklin, 36 places in
Alabama – Arkansas – Sacramento County, California – Connecticut – Georgia – Idaho – Illinois – Indiana – Iowa – Kentucky – Louisiana – Maine – Massachusetts – Michigan – Minnesota – Missouri – Nebraska – New Hampshire – New Jersey – Franklin County, New York – Macon County, North Carolina – Surry County, North Carolina – Ohio – Cambria County, Pennsylvania – Venango County, Pennsylvania – Tennessee – Texas – Vermont – Virginia – West Virginia – Jackson County, Wisconsin – Kewaunee County, Wisconsin – Manitowoc County, Wisconsin – Milwaukee County, Wisconsin – Sauk County, Wisconsin – Vernon County, Wisconsin
Franklin, Delaware County, New York – William Temple Franklin
Franklin Lakes, New Jersey – Benjamin Franklin
Franklin Park, New Jersey – Benjamin Franklin
Franklin Township – Benjamin Franklin, 77 places in
DeKalb County, Illinois – DeKalb County, Indiana – Floyd County, Indiana – Grant County, Indiana – Harrison County, Indiana – Hendricks County, Indiana – Henry County, Indiana – Johnson County, Indiana – Kosciusko County, Indiana – Marion County, Indiana – Montgomery County, Indiana – Owen County, Indiana – Pulaski County, Indiana – Putnam County, Indiana – Randolph County, Indiana – Ripley County, Indiana – Washington County, Indiana – Wayne County, Indiana – Allamakee County, Iowa – Appanoose County, Iowa – Bremer County, Iowa – Cass County, Iowa – Clarke County, Iowa – Decatur County, Iowa – Story County, Iowa – Bourbon County, Kansas – Edwards County, Kansas – Franklin County, Kansas – Jackson County, Kansas – Clare County, Michigan – Houghton County, Michigan – Lenawee County, Michigan – Wright County, Minnesota – Bergen County, New Jersey – Gloucester County, New Jersey – Hunterdon County, New Jersey – Somerset County, New Jersey – Warren County, New Jersey – Rowan County, North Carolina – Surry County, North Carolina – Adams County, Ohio – Brown County, Ohio – Clermont County, Ohio – Columbiana County, Ohio – Coshocton County, Ohio – Darke County, Ohio – Franklin County, Ohio – Fulton County, Ohio – Harrison County, Ohio – Jackson County, Ohio – Licking County, Ohio – Mercer County, Ohio – Monroe County, Ohio – Morrow County, Ohio – Portage County, Ohio – Richland County, Ohio – Ross County, Ohio – Shelby County, Ohio – Tuscarawas County, Ohio – Warren County, Ohio – Wayne County, Ohio – Adams County, Pennsylvania – Beaver County, Pennsylvania – Bradford County, Pennsylvania – Butler County, Pennsylvania – Carbon County, Pennsylvania – Chester County, Pennsylvania – Columbia County, Pennsylvania – Erie County, Pennsylvania – Fayette County, Pennsylvania – Greene County, Pennsylvania – Huntingdon County, Pennsylvania – Luzerne County, Pennsylvania – Lycoming County, Pennsylvania – Snyder County, Pennsylvania – Susquehanna County, Pennsylvania – York County, Pennsylvania
Franklinton, Louisiana and Franklinton, North Carolina – Benjamin Franklin
Frankstown Township, Blair County, Pennsylvania – Stephen Franks (trader)
Franktown, Colorado – J. Frank Gardner (resident)
Fraser, Delaware County, New York – Hugh Frazer (landowner) (note the spelling)
Frederic Township, Michigan – Frederick Barker (pioneer)
Frederick, Colorado – Frederick A. Clark (landholder)
Frederick, Maryland – Frederick Calvert, 6th Baron Baltimore
Fredericksburg, Virginia – Frederick, Prince of Wales
Fredericktown, Missouri – George Frederick Bollinger (state legislator)
Freeborn, Minnesota – William Freeborn (town councillor)
Freelandville, Indiana – Dr. John F. Freeland
Freemansburg, Pennsylvania – Jacob Freeman
Fremont, California, and numerous other Fremonts – John C. Frémont
Frenchburg, Kentucky – Richard French (judge)
French Mills, New York – Abel French (factory owner)
Friant, California – Thomas Friant (lumber company executive)
Frye Island, Maine – Captain Joseph Frye
Fryeburg, Maine – Captain Joseph Frye
Fulford, Colorado – A.H. Fulford (pioneer)
Fullerton, California – George H. Fullerton (president of the Pacific Land and Improvement Company)
Fullerton, Nebraska – Randall Fuller (stockman)
Fulton, South Dakota – Robert Fulton (inventor of the first commercially successful steamboat)
Funk, Nebraska – P.C. Funk
Funkstown, Maryland – Jacob Funk (landowner)

G
Gadsden, Alabama – James Gadsden
Gagetown, Michigan – James Gage (settler)
Gaines, New York – Gen. Edmund P. Gaines
Gainesboro, Tennessee – Gen. Edmund P. Gaines
Gainesville, 4 places in Florida, Georgia, New York, and Texas – Gen. Edmund P. Gaines
Galen, New York – Galen
Galesburg, Illinois – George Washington Gale (founder)
Galesville, Wisconsin – George Gale (founder)
Gallatin River – Albert Gallatin
Gallatin, New York and Gallatin, Tennessee – Albert Gallatin
Gallaway, Tennessee – J.M. Gallaway (mill owner)
Gallitzin, Pennsylvania – Pierre Gallitzin (founder)
Galveston, Texas – Bernardo de Gálvez y Madrid, Count of Gálvez, José de Gálvez, 1st Marquess of Sonora, Matías de Gálvez y Gallardo
Gambier, Ohio – James Gambier, 1st Baron Gambier (benefactor of Kenyon College)
Gansevoort, New York – Col. Peter Gansevoort (resident)
Garberville, California – Jacob C. Garber (first postmaster)
Gardiner, Maine – Dr. Sylvester Gardiner (Boston physician)
Gardiner, New York – Lieutenant Governor Addison Gardiner
Gardiners Island, New York – Lion Gardiner (settler)
Gardner, Kansas – Henry Gardner, Governor of Massachusetts
Gardner, Massachusetts – Colonel Thomas Gardner (killed during the Battle of Bunker Hill)
Garfield, 6 places in Illinois, Kansas, Maine, New Jersey, Mahoning County, Ohio, and Oregon – James A. Garfield
Garibaldi, Oregon – Giuseppe Garibaldi
Garland, Maine – Joseph Garland (settler)
Garland, Texas – Attorney General Augustus Hill Garland
Garlock, California – Eugene Garlock (early businessman)
Garnett, Kansas – W.A. Garnett (resident of Louisville, Kentucky)
Garrett, Indiana and Garrett, Pennsylvania – John W. Garrett (president of the Baltimore and Ohio Railroad)
Garretson, South Dakota – A. S. Garretson (banker)
Garrison, Texas – Z.B. Garrison (settler)
Gary, Indiana – Elbert Henry Gary
Garysburg, North Carolina – Roderick B. Gary
Gastonia, North Carolina – William Gaston (judge)
Gasquet, California – Horace Gasquet (first postmaster)
Gates, New York and Gatesville, North Carolina – Gen. Horatio Gates
Gaylesville, Alabama – George W. Gayle
Gaylord, Kansas – C.E. Gaylord (resident of Marshall County)
Gayoso, Missouri – Manuel Gayoso de Lemos (colonial governor)
Geary, Kansas – Gov. John W. Geary
Geddes, New York – James Geddes (early settler)
Gentry, Missouri – Col. Richard Gentry
George, Washington – George Washington
George West, Texas – George Washington West (founder)
Georgetown, California – George Phipps (founder)
Georgetown, Colorado – George Griffith (clerk of court)
Georgetown, Delaware – George Mitchell (resident)
Georgetown, Kentucky and Georgetown, Massachusetts – George Washington
Georgetown, Maine and Georgetown, South Carolina – George I of Great Britain
Georgetown, Washington, D.C. – George II of Great Britain
Georgia (U.S. state) – King George II of Great Britain
German, New York – Gen. Obadiah German (landowner)
Gerry, New York – Elbridge Gerry
Gervais, Oregon – Joseph Gervais (pioneer)
Gettysburg, Pennsylvania – Samuel Gettys (settler)
Gibbon River – Gen. John Gibbon
Gibbon, Oregon – Gen. John Gibbon
Gibbonsville, Idaho – Gen. John Gibbon
Gibson, Tennessee – Col. Thomas Gibson
Gilbert, Arizona – William "Bobby" Gilbert
Gilberton, Pennsylvania – John Gilbert (mine owner)
Gilchrist County, Florida – Albert W. Gilchrist Governor of Florida from 1909 to 1913
Gilford, New Hampshire – S.S. Gillman (settler)
Gill, Massachusetts – Moses Gill (lieutenant governor of Massachusetts)
Gillette, Wyoming – Weston Gillette (surveyor and civil engineer)
Gilman, Colorado – H.H. Gilman (resident)
Gilsum, New Hampshire – Samuel Gilbert and his son-in-law, Thomas Sumner (proprietors)
Girard, Pennsylvania – Stephen Girard
Girardville, Pennsylvania – Stephen Girard
Gladstone, Michigan and Gladstone, North Dakota – William Ewart Gladstone
Gladwin, Michigan – Maj. Henry Gladwin
Glen, New York – Jacob Glen (resident)
Glen Burnie, Maryland – Elias Glenn (district attorney) and his descendants
Glens Falls, New York – John Glenn (discoverer)
Glennville, California – James M. Glenn (blacksmith)
Glocester, Rhode Island – Henry Stuart, Duke of Gloucester (note spelling)
Glover, Vermont – Brigadier General John Glover (proprietor)
Goddard, Kansas – J.F. Goddard (manager of the Atchison, Topeka and Santa Fe Railway)
Godfrey, Illinois – Capt. Benjamin Godfrey
Goff, Kansas – Edward H. Goff
Goffstown, New Hampshire – Colonel John Goffe (settler) (note spelling)
Goldsboro, North Carolina – M.T. Goldsboro
Goodhue, Minnesota – James M. Goodhue (journalist)
Gorham, Maine and Gorham, New Hampshire – Captain John Gorham (The town in New Hampshire was named for the one in Maine).
Gorham, New York – Nathaniel Gorham
Gorman Township, Otter Tail County, Minnesota – Gov. Willis A. Gorman
Gosnold, Massachusetts – Bartholomew Gosnold (settler)
Gouldsboro, Maine – Robert Gould (landholder)
Gouverneur, New York – Gouverneur Morris
Gove City, Kansas – Capt. Grenville L. Gove
Governors Island (Massachusetts) – Gov. John Winthrop (landowner)
Governors Island (New York) – Gov. Wouter van Twiller (landowner)
Grafton, Massachusetts – Charles FitzRoy, 2nd Duke of Grafton
Grafton, New Hampshire – Augustus FitzRoy, 3rd Duke of Grafton (relative of colonial governor Benning Wentworth)
Graham, North Carolina – William Alexander Graham (U.S. Senator)
Granby, Massachusetts – John Manners, Marquess of Granby (hero of the Seven Years' War)
Granby, Vermont – Marquis of Granby
Granger, Washington – Walter Granger (superintendent of the Washington Irrigation Company)
Grant, 4 places in Humboldt County, California, Iowa, Kansas, and Nebraska – Ulysses S. Grant
Grantsville, West Virginia – Ulysses S. Grant
Grantham, New Hampshire – Thomas Robinson, 1st Baron Grantham
Gratiot, Wisconsin – Col. Henry Gratiot
Grattan Township, Michigan – Henry Grattan
Gravette, Arkansas – E.T. Gravette
Gray, Maine – Thomas Gray (proprietor)
Grays Harbor, Washington – Capt. Robert Gray (explorer)
Grayson, Kentucky – Col. Robert Grayson
Graysville, Indiana – Joe Gray (founder)
Great Barrington, Massachusetts – William Barrington, 2nd Viscount Barrington
Greeley, Colorado and Greeley, Kansas – Horace Greeley (editor of the New York Tribune)
Greeley Center, Nebraska – Peter Greeley
Greene, Iowa – George Green (judge) (note the spelling)
Greene, Maine and Greene, New York – Nathanael Greene
Greeneville, Tennessee – Nathanael Greene
Greenleaf, Kansas – A.W. Greenleaf (treasurer of the Union Pacific Railroad)
Greensboro, North Carolina – Nathanael Greene
Greensboro, Vermont – Timothy Green (landowner)
Greensburg, Kansas – Col. D.R. Green
Greenup, Kentucky – Gov. Christopher Greenup
Greenville, Kentucky and Greenville, North Carolina – Nathanael Greene
Greenville, Michigan – John Green (settler)
Greenwood, Arkansas – Moses Greenwood (merchant)
Greenwood, El Dorado County, California – John Greenwood (early settler)
Greenwood, Mississippi – Greenwood LeFlore (Choctaw chief)
Greenwood, Nebraska – J.S. Green (settler)
Greig, New York – John Greig (U.S. representative)
Grestley, California – James Grestley
Gridley, California – George W. Gridley (founder)
Gridley, Illinois – Asahel Gridley
Griffin, Georgia – Gen. Lewis Lawrence Griffin (president of the Macon and Western Railroad)
Grimes, Iowa – James W. Grimes (U.S. Senator)
Grimesland, North Carolina – Gen. Bryan Grimes
Grinnell, Iowa – W.H. Grinnell (resident)
Griswold, Connecticut – Governor Roger Griswold
Grover, North Carolina and Grover, South Carolina – Grover Cleveland
Grundy Center, Iowa – Felix Grundy (U.S. Senator from Tennessee)
Guilford, Maine – Moses Guilford Law (first white child born here)
Guilford, Vermont – Francis North, 1st Earl of Guilford
Gunnison, Colorado – Capt. John Williams Gunnison (explorer)
Gunnison Island, Utah – Capt. John Williams Gunnison (explorer)
Gunnison River – Capt. John Williams Gunnison (explorer)
Guntown, Mississippi – James G. Gunn (early settler)
Gurnee, Illinois – Walter S. Gurnee (mayor of Chicago)
Gustine, California – Augusta Miller, daughter of Henry Miller (rancher)
Guthrie Center, Iowa – Capt. Edwin B. Guthrie
Guttenberg, Iowa and Guttenberg, New Jersey – Johannes Gutenberg (note the spelling)

H
Hackettstown, New Jersey – Samuel Hackett (early settler)
Haddonfield, New Jersey – Elizabeth Haddon) (landowner)
Haddon Township, New Jersey – Elizabeth Haddon (landowner)
Hagerstown, Maryland – Jonathan Hager
Hahns Peak and Hahns Peak Village, Colorado – Joe Hahn (settler)
Halcott, New York – George W. Halcott (sheriff)
Hale, Missouri – John P. Hale (Carrollton resident)
Halifax, Massachusetts and Halifax, Vermont – George Montagu-Dunk, 2nd Earl of Halifax
Hallowell, Maine – Benjamin Hallowell (landowner)
Hallstead, Pennsylvania – William F. Hallstead (general manager of the Delaware, Lackawanna and Western Railroad)
Hallsville, New York – Capt. Robert Hall
Hallsville, Texas – Robert Burton Hall (railroader)
Halstead, Kansas – Murat Halstead (journalist)
Hamden, Connecticut – John Hampden (English statesman) (note spelling)
Hamersville, Ohio – Gen. Thomas L. Hamer
Hamilton, Georgia – James Hamilton Jr. (Governor of South Carolina)
Hamilton, Massachusetts and Hamilton, Ohio – Alexander Hamilton
Hamilton, Montana – J.W. Hamilton (provided the right-of-way to the railroad)
Hamilton City, California – J.G. Hamilton (sugar company president)
Hamilton County, 7 places in Florida, Illinois, Indiana, Kansas, New York, Ohio, and Tennessee – Alexander Hamilton
Hamlin, Kansas – Vice President Hannibal Hamlin
Hammond, Illinois – Charles Goodrich Hamilton (railroader)
Hammond, Indiana – George H. Hammond (Detroit butcher who founded a meat-packing plant here)
Hammond, New York – Abijah Hammond (landowner)
Hammonton, California – W.P. Hammond (gold mine official)
Hampden, Maine and Hampden, Massachusetts – John Hampden (English patriot)
Hampton, South Carolina – Gen. Wade Hampton I
Hancock, 6 places in Maine, Massachusetts, Michigan, New Hampshire, New York, and Vermont – John Hancock
Hanford, California – James Madison Hanford (railroad executive)
Hankamer, Texas – I. A. Hankamer (early settler)
Hannibal, Missouri and Hannibal, New York – Hannibal
Hanson, Massachusetts – Alexander C. Hanson (Maryland newspaper publisher and U.S. Senator)
Haralson, Georgia and Haralson County, Georgia – Gen. Hugh A. Haralson (U.S. representative)
Harbeson, Delaware – Harbeson Hickman (landowner)
Harbin Springs, California – James M. Harbin (discoverer of the springs)
Harbine, Nebraska – Col. John Harbine
Hardenburgh, New York – Johannes Hardenburgh (landowner)
Hardin, Missouri – Gov. Charles Henry Hardin
Hardin, Montana – Samuel Hardin (friend of developer Charles Henry Morrill)
Hardinsburg, Kentucky – Capt. William Hardin (pioneer)
Hardwick, Massachusetts – Philip Yorke, 1st Earl of Hardwicke (note the spelling)
Harlan, Iowa – James Harlan (United States Senator)
Harlan, Kansas – John C. Harlan (settler)
Harlan, Kentucky – Maj. Silas Harlan
Harlowton, Montana – Richard A. Harlow (president of the Montana Railroad)
Harney, Oregon – Gen. William S. Harney
Harpers Ferry, West Virginia – Robert Harper (ferry owner)
Harpersfield, New York – Joseph Harper (landowner)
Harperville, Mississippi – G.W. Harper (resident)
Harrietstown, New York – Harriet Duane (wife of James Duane)
Harriman, New York – E. H. Harriman (president of the Union Pacific Railroad)
Harrington, Delaware – Samuel M. Harrington (judge)
Harrisburg, Inyo County, California – Shorty Harris (gold discoverer)
Harrisburg, New York – Richard Harrison
Harrisburg, Pennsylvania – John Harris, Sr. (founder)
Harrison, Maine – Harrison Gray Otis (landowner)
Harrison, New Jersey – William Henry Harrison
Harrison, New York – John Harrison (Quaker leader)
Harrison Township, New Jersey – William Henry Harrison
Harrisonburg, Virginia – Thomas Harrison (early settler who founded the community)
Harrisville, New Hampshire – Milan Harris (mill owner)
Harrisville, New York – Fosket Harris (settler)
Harrisville, Ohio – Meigs Harris (pioneer)
Harrisville, West Virginia – Thomas Harris
Harrodsburg, Kentucky – Col. James Harrod (settler)
Hart's Location, New Hampshire – Colonel John Hart
Hartsville, Indiana – Gideon B. Hart (pioneer)
Hartwick, New York – Christopher Hartwick (landowner)
Harvard, Illinois – John Harvard (indirectly, via Harvard University)
Harvard, Massachusetts – John Harvard
Hastings, Michigan – Eurotas Hastings (state auditor)
Hathaway Pines, California – Robert B. Hathaway (first postmaster)
Hattiesburg, Mississippi – Hattie Hardy (wife of pioneer lumberman and civil engineer William H. Hardy)
Haugan, Montana – H. G. Haugan (land commissioner of the Chicago, Milwaukee, St. Paul and Pacific Railroad)
Havensville, Kansas – Paul E. Havens (Leavenworth resident)
Hawesville, Kentucky – Richard Hawes (U.S. representative)
Hawkeye, Iowa – Chief Hawkeye
Hawley, Massachusetts – Joseph Hawley (local leader in the American Revolution)
Hawthorne, New Jersey – Nathaniel Hawthorne
Hayden, Colorado – Ferdinand Vandeveer Hayden (geologist)
Hayden Hill, California – Ferdinand Vandeveer Hayden (geologist)
Hayes, California – William J. Hayes (first postmaster)
Hayesville, North Carolina – George W. Hayes (state senator)
Hays, Kansas – Gen. William Hays
Hayward, California – William Dutton Hayward (early settler)
Hayward, Minnesota – David Hayward (settler)
Hazard, Kentucky – Commodore Oliver Hazard Perry (hero of the War of 1812)
Hazardville, Connecticut – Colonel Augustus George Hazard (gunpowder manufacturer)
Hazelton, California – Hazelton Blodget (son of Hugh A. Blodget, oilman)
Hazelton, Kansas – Rev. J.H. Hazelton (founder)
Hazelrigg, Indiana – H.G. Hazlerigg (founder) (note the spelling)
Healdsburg, California – Col. Harmon Heald (settler)
Hearst, California – George Hearst
Heath, Massachusetts – General William Heath
Heber, California – A.H. Heber (development company president)
Heber City, Utah – Heber C. Kimball (Mormon leader)
Heceta Beach, Oregon – Bruno de Heceta (explorer)
Helena, New York – Helena Pitcairn
Helm, California – William Helm (early rancher)
Henderson, Nevada – U.S. Senator Charles B. Henderson
Henderson, Kentucky and Henderson, Tennessee – Col. Richard Henderson
Henderson, Nebraska – David Henderson (settler)
Henderson, New York – William Henderson (landowner)
Hendersonville, North Carolina – North Carolina Chief Justice Leonard Henderson
Hendry County, Florida – Major Francis A. Hendry
Hennepin, Illinois – Louis Hennepin (explorer)
Hennessey, Oklahoma – Pat Hennessey (freighter)
Henniker, New Hampshire – John Henniker, 1st Baron Henniker
Henrietta, New York – Laura Pulteney, 1st Countess of Bath
Henrietta, North Carolina – Henrietta Tanner
Hensley, Arkansas – William B. Hensley (founder and landowner)
Hepburn, Iowa – William Peters Hepburn (U.S. representative)
Hepler, Kansas – B.F. Hepler (resident of Fort Scott)
Herington, Kansas – M.D. Herington (founder)
Herkimer, New York – Nicholas Herkimer (militia general in the American Revolutionary War)
Herlong, California – Capt. Henry W. Herlong (World War II casualty)
Herman, Nebraska – Samuel Herman (railroad conductor)
Hermann, Missouri – Arminius (Germanic chief)
Hernando, Mississippi – Hernando de Soto
Hernando County, Florida – Hernando de Soto
Hershey, Pennsylvania – Milton S. Hershey (Chocolatier)
Hertford County, North Carolina – Francis Seymour-Conway, 1st Marquess of Hertford
Heuvelton, New York – Jacob van Heuvel
Hewes Point, Maine – Paola Hewes (settler)
Heyburn, Idaho – Senator Weldon Brinton Heyburn
Hickman, Kentucky – Capt. Paschal Hickman
Hickory, Mississippi and Hickory, North Carolina – Andrew Jackson (nicknamed "Old Hickory")
Hicksville, New York – Charles Hicks (Quaker cleric)
Hicksville, Ohio – Henry W. Hicks (founder)
Hildreth, California – Tom Hildreth (founder and merchant)
Higginsport, Ohio – Col. Robert Higgins (founder)
Hildebran, North Carolina – Pope Gregory VII (né Hildebrand)
Hill, New Hampshire – Isaac Hill (governor of New Hampshire)
Hillrose, Colorado – Rose Hill Emerson (daughter of early landholder)
Hillsboro, Kansas – John G. Hill (mayor)
Hillsborough, New Hampshire and Hillsborough, North Carolina – Sir Wills Hill, 1st Marquess of Downshire and 1st Earl of Hillsborough 
Hillsborough County, Florida – Sir Wills Hill, 1st Marquess of Downshire and 1st Earl of Hillsborough
Hinesburg, Vermont – Abel Hine (town clerk)
Hinesville, Georgia – Charlton Hines
Hinsdale, Massachusetts – Rev. Theodore Hinsdale (woolen mill owner)
Hinsdale, New Hampshire – Colonel Ebenezer Hinsdale
Hinsdale, New York – Colonel Ebenezer Hinsdale (indirectly, via Hinsdale, New Hampshire)
Hiram, Maine – Hiram I (biblical king of Tyre)
Hobart, New York – Bishop John Henry Hobart
Hobergs, California – Gustave Hoberg (founder, resort owner)
Hodgdon, Maine – John Hodgdon (landowner)
Hodgenville, Kentucky – Robert Hodgen
Hodson, California – J.J. Hodson (copper mining financier)
Hoffman Estates, Illinois – Sam and Jack Hoffman (builders)
Hoisington, Kansas – A.J. Hoisington (resident of Great Bend)
Holbrook, Massachusetts – Elisha N. Holbrook (benefactor)
Holden, Massachusetts – Samuel Holden (banker)
Holderness, New Hampshire – Robert Darcy, 4th Earl of Holderness
Holland, Massachusetts – Henry Fox, 1st Baron Holland (English statesman)
Holland Patent, New York – Henry Fox, 1st Baron Holland (landowner)
Holley, New York – Myron Holley (canal commissioner)
Holliday, Missouri – Samuel Holliday (resident of St. Louis)
Hollidaysburg, Pennsylvania – Adam and William Holliday (founders)
Hollis, New Hampshire – John Holles, Earl of Clare (ancestor of colonial governor Benning Wentworth) (note the spelling)
Holliston, Massachusetts – Thomas Hollis, Esq. of London, England (a benefactor of Harvard College)
Holmesville, Nebraska – L.M. Holmes (founder)
Holmesville, Ohio – Maj. Andrew Holmes
Holt, Missouri – Jerry Holt (landowner)
Holton, Kansas – Edward Holton
Holts Summit, Missouri – Timothy Holt
Holyoke, Massachusetts — Elizur Holyoke, (colonist, scribe and surveyor)
Homer, New York – Homer (Greek poet)
Honesdale, Pennsylvania – Philip Dale (canal builder)
Hood River, Oregon – Alexander Hood, 1st Viscount Bridport
Hookstown, Pennsylvania – Matthias Hook (resident)
Hookton, California – John Hookton (founder)
Hoover, Alabama – William H. Hoover (1890–1979), a local insurance  of Alabama
Hoover, Indiana – Riley Hoover (founder)
Hoover Town, West Virginia – Herbert Hoover
Hopkinsville, Kentucky – General Samuel Hopkins
Hopkinton, Massachusetts – Edward Hopkins (benefactor of Harvard University)
Hopkinton, New Hampshire – Edward Hopkins (benefactor of Harvard University) (indirectly, via Hopkinton, Massachusetts)
Hopkinton, New York – Roswell Hopkins (settler)
Hopkinton, Rhode Island – Gov. Stephen Hopkins
Horace, Kansas – Horace Greeley
Hornbeak, Tennessee – Frank Hornbeak (store owner, postmaster)
Hornby, New York – John Hornby (landowner)
Hornellsville, New York – George Hornell (settler)
Hornersville, Missouri – William H. Horner (founder)
Horstville, California – E. Clemons Horst (rancher)
Horton, Kansas – A.H. Horton (judge)
Houlton, Maine – Joseph Houlton (settler)
Hounsfield, New York – Ezra Hounsfield (landowner)
Houston, Delaware – John W. Houston
Houston, Minnesota, Houston, Mississippi, and Houston, Texas – Sam Houston
Houstonia, Missouri – Sam Houston
Howard, Kansas – General Oliver Otis Howard
Howard, Brown County, Wisconsin and Howard, Chippewa County, Wisconsin – Brigadier General Benjamin Howard (officer in the War of 1812)
Howard Springs, California – C.W. Howard (resort owner)
Howards Grove, Wisconsin – H.B. Howard (hotelier and postmaster)
Howell, Evansville, Indiana – Capt. Lee Howell (railroader)
Howell Township, New Jersey – Gov. Richard Howell
Howland, Maine – John Howland (Mayflower passenger)
Hoxie, Kansas – H.M. Hoxie (general manager of the Missouri Pacific Railroad)
Hubbard, Nebraska – Asahel W. Hubbard (judge)
Hubbardston, Massachusetts – Thomas Hubbard (Massachusetts Speaker of the House of Representatives and landowner)
Hubbardton, Vermont – Thomas Hubbard (landholder)
Hudson, Maine – Charles Hudson (indirectly, via Hudson, Massachusetts)
Hudson, Massachusetts – Charles Hudson (United States Representative)
Hudson, New York – Henry Hudson
Hudson, Ohio – David Hudson (settler)
Hudson River – Henry Hudson
Hugoton, Kansas – Victor Hugo
Hull, Iowa – John Hull
Humble, Texas – Pleasant Smith "Plez" Humble (postmaster)
Humboldt, Kansas and Humboldt, South Dakota – Alexander von Humboldt (German scientist, explorer and diplomat)
Hummelstown, Pennsylvania – Frederick Hummel (founder)
Humphrey, New York – Charles Humphrey (state legislator)
Humphreys Station, California – John W. Humphreys (pioneer)
Humphreysville, Connecticut – David Humphreys
Hunnewell, Kansas and Hunnewell, Missouri – H.H. Hunnewell (banker)
Hunter, New York – John Hunter (landowner)
Huntingdon, Pennsylvania – Selena Hastings, Countess of Huntingdon
Huntingdon, Tennessee – Memucan Hunt (landowner)
Huntington, Massachusetts – Charles P. Huntington
Huntington, Oregon – J.B. Huntington (landowner)
Huntington, Vermont – Josiah, Charles and Marmaduke Hunt (landholders)
Huntington, West Virginia – Collis P. Huntington
Huntington Beach, California – Henry E. Huntington
Huntley, Montana – S.O. Huntley (partner in the stagecoach firm of Clark & Huntley)
Huntsville, Alabama – John Hunt (settler)
Huntsville, Missouri – David Hunt (settler)
Hurley, New York – Francis Lovelace, Baron Hurley of Ireland
Hustisford, Wisconsin – John Hustis (settler)
Hutchinson, Kansas – C.C. Hutchinson (founder)
Hyannis, Massachusetts – Iyannough (sachem of the Cummaquid Native American tribe)
Hyde Park, Vermont – Captain Jedediah Hyde (landowner)
Hydesville, California – John Hyde (local landowner)
Hysham, Montana – Charlie J. Hysham (cattleman)

I
Iliff, Colorado – John Wesley Iliff (cattleman)
Ingalls, Oklahoma – John James Ingalls (U.S. Senator from Kansas)
Inman, Kansas – Maj. Henry Inman
Inman, Nebraska – W.H. Inman (settler)
Iola, Kansas – Iola Colborn
Ira, Vermont – Ira Allen (one of the Green Mountain Boys and brother of Ethan Allen)
Irasburg, Vermont – Ira Allen (landholder, one of the Green Mountain Boys and brother of Ethan Allen)
Ireland, Texas - John Ireland
Irvine, California – James Irvine I (landowner)
Irvine, Kentucky – Col. William Irvine
Irving, Kansas – Washington Irving
Irvington, New Jersey and Irvington, New York – Washington Irving
Irwin, California – W.A. Irwin (founder)
Irwinton, Georgia – Gov. Jared Irwin
Isabella, California, Isabella County, Michigan & Isabella Township, Michigan - Isabella I of Castile
Isle La Motte, Vermont – Captain La Motte (established Fort Sainte Anne on this island)

J
Jackson, California – Colonel Alden Jackson
Jackson, Maine – General Henry Jackson
Jackson, Burnett County, Wisconsin – Stonewall Jackson
Jackson, Wyoming – Davey Jackson
Jackson – Andrew Jackson, 14 places in
Alabama – Georgia – Kentucky – Louisiana – Michigan – Minnesota – Mississippi – Missouri – New Hampshire – New Jersey – New York – Ohio – Tennessee – Washington County, Wisconsin
Jacksonville, Arkansas – Nicholas and Elizabeth Jackson (landowners)
Jacksonville, Texas – Jackson Smith (soldier)
Jacksonville – Andrew Jackson, 7 places in
Alabama – Florida – Illinois – Missouri – North Carolina – Oregon – Pennsylvania
Jacobs Corner, California – Mattie Jacobs (first postmaster)
Jaffrey, New Hampshire – George Jaffrey (member of a wealthy Portsmouth family)
Jamesburg, California – John James (founder)
Jamestown, Indiana – James Mattock (founder)
Jamestown, Kansas – James P. Pomeroy (railroader)
Jamestown, New York – James Prendergast (settler)
Jamestown, Rhode Island – James II of England
Jamestown, Virginia – James I of England
Jamesville, New York – James De Witt
Janesville, California – Jane Bankhead (early settler)
Janesville, Wisconsin – Henry Janes (early settler and first postmaster)
Jasonville, Indiana – Jason Rogers (founder)
Jasper, 3 places in Georgia, New York, and Texas – William Jasper (American Revolution hero)
Jay, Maine, Jay, New York, and Jay, Vermont – John Jay (the first chief justice of the Supreme Court)
Jean, Nevada – Jean Fayle (wife of postmaster George Fayle)
Jefferson, Maine, Jefferson, New Jersey, and Jefferson, New Hampshire – Thomas Jefferson
Jefferson City, Missouri – Thomas Jefferson
Jefferson County, Thomas Jefferson, 19 places in
Arkansas – Colorado – Florida – Georgia – Illinois – Indiana – Iowa – Kansas – Kentucky – Mississippi – Missouri – Montana – New York – Pennsylvania – Tennessee – Washington – West Virginia – Wisconsin
Jeffersonville, Georgia – Thomas Jefferson
Jekyll Island, Georgia – Sir Joseph Jekyll
Jenny Lind, California – Jenny Lind
Jeromesville, Ohio – John Baptiste Jerome (trader)
Jesup, Iowa – Morris Ketchum Jesup
Jesus Maria, California – Jesus Maria (local farmer)
Jetmore, Kansas – Col. A.B. Jetmore
Jewell, California – Omar Jewell (local rancher)
Jewell, Kansas – Lt. Col. Lewis R. Jewell
Jewett, New York – Freeborn G. Jewett (judge)
Jewett, Ohio – T.M. Jewett (railroader)
Jim Thorpe, Pennsylvania – Jim Thorpe
Joaquin, Texas – Joaquin Morris (grandson of Benjamin Franklin Morris, who donated the land for the site)
Joe, Montana – Joe Montana
Joe Walker Town, California – Joe Walker
Johnsburg, New York – John Thurman (settler)
Johnson, Nebraska – Julius A. Johnson (landowner)
Johnson, Vermont – William Samuel Johnson (landowner)
Johnson City, Kansas – Col. Alexander S. Johnson
Johnston, Rhode Island – Augustus Johnston (colonial attorney general)
Johnston County, North Carolina – Gabriel Johnston, 6th Governor of North Carolina
Johnstonville, California – Robert Johnston (town developer)
Johnstown, Colorado – John Parish (father of Harvey J. Parish, who platted the town)
Johnstown (city), New York – Sir William Johnson, 1st Baronet (founder)
Johnstown, Pennsylvania – Joseph Jahns (settler) (note the spelling)
Joliet, Illinois – Louis Jolliet (note the spelling)
Jonesboro, Maine – John Coffin Jones (landholder)
Jonesborough, Tennessee – William Jones (statesman)
Jonesport, Maine – John Coffin Jones (landholder)
Jonesville, Indiana – Benjamin Jones (founder) 
Jonesville, Virginia – Frederick Jones (landowner)
Joplin, Missouri – Rev. H.G. Joplin (resident) (indirectly, via Joplin Creek)
Joplin Creek, Missouri – Rev. H.G. Joplin (resident)
Jordan, Montana – Arthur Jordan (founder)
Judith River – Judith Hancock
Judsonia, Arkansas – Rev. Adoniram Judson (missionary)
Judsonville, California – Egbert Judson (part owner of local mine)
Julesburg, Colorado – Jules Beni (established a trading post here)
Jump-off Joe – Joe McLaughlin (trapper)
Juneau, Alaska – Joe Juneau (prospector)
Juneau, Wisconsin – Solomon Juneau (founder of Milwaukee)

K
Kamrar, Iowa – J.L. Kamrar (judge)
Kanawyers, California – Peter Apoleon Kanawyer (founder)
Kaneville, Illinois – Gen. Thomas L. Kane
Karnes City, Texas – Henry Karnes (Texas patriot)
Kaufman, Texas – David S. Kaufman (U.S. representative)
Kearney, Missouri – Charles E. Kearney, the president of the Hannibal and Saint Joseph Railroad 
Kearney, Nebraska – Gen. Philip Kearny (note the spelling) 
Kearny, New Jersey – Gen. Philip Kearny 
Keene, California – James R. Keene (financier)
Keene, New Hampshire – Sir Benjamin Keene (English minister to Spain and West Indies trader)
Keenesburg, Colorado – Les Keene (settler)
Keeseville, New York – Richard Keese (founder)
Keizer, Oregon – Thomas Dove Keizur
Kelleys Island, Ohio – Datus and Irad Kelly (landowners) (note the spelling)
Kellogg, Idaho – Noah Kellogg (prospector)
Kelsey, California – Benjamin Kelsey (founder)
Kelso, California – Napoleon B. Kelso (first postmaster)
Kenansville, North Carolina – James Kenan (U.S. representative)
Kendall, New York – Postmaster General Amos Kendall
Kennard, Nebraska – Thomas P. Kennard (secretary of state of Nebraska)
Kenedy, Texas – Mifflin Kenedy (rancher, steamboat owner and railroad investor)
Kenner, Louisiana – Duncan F. Kenner (lawyer)
Kensington, New Hampshire – Edward Rich, 8th Earl of Warwick and Baron Kensington (owner of Kensington Palace in London)
Kent, Ohio – Marvin Kent
Kentfield, California – Albert Emmet Kent (landowner)
Kenton, Ohio – Gen. Simon Kenton
Keough Hot Springs, California – Philip P. Keough (resort owner)
Keokuk, Iowa – Keokuk (Sauk leader)
Kerman, California – W.G. Kerckhoff and Jacob Mansar (promoters)
Kettleman City, California – Dave Kettleman (early rancher)
Keyesville, California – Richard M. Keyes (gold discoverer in Kern County)
Kiester, Minnesota – Jacob Kiester (county historian)
Kilbourn City, Wisconsin – Byron Kilbourn (pioneer)
Kilbuck Township, Allegheny County, Pennsylvania – chieftain of the Lenape
Kimball, South Dakota – J.W. Kimball (surveyor)
Kincaid, Kansas – Robert Kincaid (resident of Mound City)
King City, California – Charles King (founder)
King of Prussia, Pennsylvania – after a local tavern named after Frederick II of Prussia
Kingfield, Maine – William King (future governor of Maine)
Kingman, Kansas – Samuel Austin Kingman (judge)
Kingman, Maine – R.S. Kingman
Kingsbury Plantation, Maine – Judge Sanford Kingsbury (landowner)
Kingsley, Michigan – Judson Kingsley (landowner)
Kingston, Georgia – J.P. King (resident of Augusta)
Kingston, Massachusetts – Evelyn Pierrepont, 1st Duke of Kingston-upon-Hull
Kingston, Missouri – Gov. Austin Augustus King
Kingsville, Missouri – Gen. William M. King (resident)
Kingsville, Texas – Captain Richard King (owner of the King Ranch)
Kinman Pond, California – Seth Kinman (settler)
Kinsley, Kansas – W.E.W. Kinsley (resident of Boston, Massachusetts)
Kinston, North Carolina – George III
Kirbyville, Texas – John Henry Kirby (lumber businessman)
Kirkland, New York – Rev. Samuel Kirkland
Kirklin, Indiana – Nathan Kirk (founder)
Kirksville, Missouri – Jesse Kirk
Kirkwood, California – Zack Kirkwood (rancher and early settler)
Kirkwood, Delaware and Kirkwood, Ohio – Maj. Robert Kirkwood (officer in the American Revolutionary War)
Kirtland, Ohio – Turhand Kirtland (principal of the Connecticut Land Company)
Kirwin, Kansas – Col. John Kirwin
Kiryas Joel, New York – Joel Teitelbaum (rabbi of Satmar)
Kit Carson, California and Kit Carson, Colorado – Kit Carson
Klej Grange, Maryland – Kate, Louise, Emma, and Josephine Drexel (daughters of Joseph William Drexel)
Kneeland, California – John A. and Tom Kneeland (first settlers)
Knights Landing, California – Dr. William Knight (early settler)
Knightsen, California – George W. Knight (town founder) and his wife Christina Christensen
Knightsville, Indiana – A.W. Knight (founder)
Knowles, California – F.E. Knowles (granite quarry owner)
Knox, Maine – General Henry Knox
Knoxville, California – Ranar B. Knox, first postmaster
Knoxville, 4 places in Georgia, Mississippi, Albany County, New York, and Tennessee – Henry Knox
Knoxville, Pennsylvania – John C. Knox (judge)
Kokomo, Indiana – Ma-Ko-Ko-Mo (Miami tribal chief)
Kortright, New York – Lawrence Kortright (patentee)
Kosciusko, Mississippi – Tadeusz Kościuszko
Kossuth, Mississippi and Kossuth, Ohio – Lajos Kossuth
Kotzebue, Alaska – Otto von Kotzebue
Kountze, Texas – Herman and Augustus Kountze (financial backers of the Sabine and East Texas Railroad)
Kranzburg, South Dakota – Nicholas Friedrich Wilhelm, Johann, Mathais, and Paul Ferdinand Kranz (settlers)
Kyle, Texas – Captain Fergus Kyle (founder)

L

Laceyville, Ohio – Maj. John S. Lacey
Laclede, Missouri – Pierre Laclède (founder of St. Louis)
La Conner, Washington – J.J. Connor (settler) (note the spelling)
Laddonia, Missouri – Amos Ladd (settler)
Laddville, California – Alphonso Ladd (founder)
Lafayette, Colorado – Lafayette Miller (settler and husband of Mary Miller, who platted the town)
Lairds Landing, California – George and Charles Laird (early settlers)
Lairdsville, New York – Samuel Laird (settler)
Lake Ann, Michigan – Ann Wheelock (settler's wife)
Lake Charles, Louisiana – Charles Sallier
Lake Helen, Florida – Helen DeLand (founder's daughter)
Lake Lanier (Georgia) – Sidney Lanier (poet)
Lake Wilson, Minnesota – Jonathan E. Wilson (landowner)
Lakin, Kansas – David L. Lakin (resident of Topeka)
Missouri - Mirabeau B. Lamar
Lamar, 3 places in Colorado and Mississippi – L.Q.C. Lamar
Lamar River (Wyoming) – L.Q.C. Lamar
Lamartine, Wisconsin – Alphonse de Lamartine (French historian)
Lambertville, New Jersey – John Lambert (settler)
Lamoine, Maine – DeLamoine (early landowner)
Lamy, New Mexico – Archbishop Jean-Baptiste Lamy
Lanare, California – L.A. Nares (developer)
Landaff, New Hampshire – Bishop of Llandaff (Llandaff is the spelling of the name on the town charter)
Landisburg, Pennsylvania – James Landis (founder)
Lanesborough, Massachusetts – James Lane, 2nd Viscount Lanesborough
Lanesboro, Pennsylvania – Martin Lane (settler)
Langdon, New Hampshire – Governor John Langdon
Langhorne, Pennsylvania – Jeremiah Langhorne (jurist)
Lanier, Georgia – Clement Lanier
Lansingburgh, New York – Abraham Lansing (founder)
Laramie River (Ohio) – Pierre-Louis de Lorimier (French fur trader)
Laramie, Wyoming – Jacques La Ramée (French-Canadian fur trader)
Larned, Kansas – Gen. B.F. Larned
Largo, California – Lemuel F. Long (early settler; Largo is Spanish for Long)
Larrabee, Iowa – Gov. William Larrabee
LaSalle, Illinois – René-Robert Cavelier, Sieur de La Salle (explorer)
Lassen Peak (California) – Peter Lassen (explorer) 
Latrobe, California and Latrobe, Pennsylvania – Benjamin Henry Latrobe, II
Latty, Ohio – A.S. Latty (settler)
Lauderdale, Mississippi – Col. James Lauderdale
Laughlin, California – James H. Laughlin, Jr. (landowner)
Laughlin, Nevada – Don Laughlin (founder)
Laurens, South Carolina – Henry Laurens
Lavers' Crossing, California – David Lavers (founder)
Lawrence, Kansas – Amos Lawrence
Lawrence, Massachusetts – Abbott Lawrence (founder)
Lawrenceburg, Tennessee – Capt. James Lawrence
Lawrenceville, Georgia – Capt. James Lawrence
Lawson, Colorado – Alexander Lawson (innkeeper)
Lawton, Michigan – Nathaniel Lawton (landowner)
Laytonville, California – F.B. Layton (founder)
Le Claire, Iowa – Antoine Le Claire (founder of Davenport)
Le Grand, California – William Legrand Dickinson
Le Mars, Iowa – Lucy Underhill, Elizabeth Parson, Mary Weare, Anna Blair, Rebecca Smith and Sarah Reynolds (the first initials of six women aboard on a railroad excursion)
Le Ray, New York – Le Ray Chaumont
Le Raysville, Pennsylvania – Vincent le Ray (landowner's son)
Leakesville, Mississippi – Gov. Walter Leake
Leavenworth, Kansas – Gen. Henry Leavenworth (indirectly, via Fort Leavenworth)
Leavitt, California – May F. Leavitt (first postmaster)
Lebec, California – Peter Lebeck (killed by a bear nearby in 1837)
Lecompton, Kansas – Judge D.S. Lecompte
Ledyard, Connecticut – Col. William Ledyard (state militiaman)
Ledyard, New York – Benjamin Ledyard (land agent)
Lee, California – Dick Lee (discoverer of gold at the site)
Lee, Maine – Stephen Lee (settler)
Lee, Massachusetts, Lee, New Hampshire, and Lee, New York – General Charles Lee
Leechburg, Pennsylvania – David Leech
Lee Vining, California – Leroy Vining (founder)
Leesville, California – Lee Harl (local landowner)
Leicester, Massachusetts – Robert Dudley, 1st Earl of Leicester
Leitchfield, Kentucky – Maj. David Leitch
Leland, Illinois – Edwin S. Leland
Lemoore, California – Dr. Lovern Lee Moore (early settler)
Lempster, New Hampshire – from one of the titles of Sir Thomas Farmer of a "Lempster" in England
Lennox, South Dakota – Ben Lennox (railroad official)
Lenoir, North Carolina – Gen. William Lenoir
Lenora, Kansas – Lenora Hauser
Lenox, Massachusetts – Charles Lennox, 3rd Duke of Richmond (note the spelling)
Leon, Kansas – Juan Ponce de León
Leonard, Michigan – Leonard Rowland
Leonardville, Kansas – Leonard T. Smith (railroader)
Leopold, Indiana – Leopold I of Belgium
Le Roy, New York – Herman Le Roy (landowner)
Letcher, California – F.F. Letcher (county supervisor)
Leverett, Massachusetts – John Leverett (twentieth governor of the Massachusetts Bay Colony)
Levittown, 2 places in New York and Pennsylvania  – William Levitt
Lewis and Clark River (Oregon) – Capt. Meriwether Lewis and William Clark (explorers)
Lewis, Vermont – Nathan, Sevignior and Timothy Lewis (landholders)
Lewisboro, New York – John Lewis (resident)
Lewisburg, West Virginia – Samuel Lewis
Lewiston, Idaho – Meriwether Lewis
Lewiston, Minnesota – Johnathan Smith Lewis (settler)
Lewiston (town), New York – Gov. Morgan Lewis
Lewistown, Ohio – Capt. John Lewis (Shawnee chief)
Lewistown, Pennsylvania – William Lewis
Lila C, California – Lila C. Coleman (mine owner's daughter)
Lillis, California – Simon C. Lillis (ranch superintendent)
Ligonier, Pennsylvania – John Ligonier, 1st Earl Ligonier
Lillington, North Carolina – Col. Alexander Lillington
Limon, Colorado – John Limon (or Lymon) (railroad construction supervisor)
Lincklaen, New York – John Lincklaen (landowner)
Lincoln, Alabama and Lincoln, Vermont – Major General Benjamin Lincoln
Lincoln, California – Charles Lincoln Wilson (one of the organizers and directors of the California Central Railroad)
Lincoln, Illinois, Lincoln, Nebraska, and Lincoln, Rhode Island – Abraham Lincoln
Lincoln, Maine – Enoch Lincoln (Maine's sixth governor)
Lincoln, New Hampshire – Henry Fiennes Pelham-Clinton, 2nd Duke of Newcastle, 9th Earl of Lincoln
Lincoln Center, Kansas – Abraham Lincoln (indirectly, via Lincoln County, Kansas)
Lincolnton, Georgia and Lincolnton, North Carolina – Major General Benjamin Lincoln
Lincolnville, Maine – Major General Benjamin Lincoln (landowner)
Lincolnville, South Carolina – Abraham Lincoln
Lindley, New York – Col. Eleazar Lindley
Linn, Missouri – Lewis F. Linn (U.S. Senator)
Linneus, Missouri – Lewis F. Linn (U.S. Senator)
Litchfield, California – Thomas Litch (pioneer)
Litchfield, New Hampshire – George Henry Lee, Earl of Litchfield
Littleton, Colorado – Richard S. Little
Littleton, Massachusetts – George Lyttelton, 1st Baron Lyttelton (note the spelling)
Littleton, New Hampshire – Col. Moses Little
Livermore, California – Robert Livermore
Livermore, Maine – Deacon Elijah Livermore (early settler)
Livermore Falls, Maine – Deacon Elijah Livermore (early settler)
Livingston, California – Charles C. Livingston (railroad official)
Livingston, Montana – Johnston Livingston (Northern Pacific Railway stockholder and director)
Livingston, New Jersey – William Livingston
Locke, New York – John Locke
Lockwood, 3 places in California, New York, and West Virginia – Belva Ann Lockwood
Logan Creek Dredge (Nebraska) – Logan Fontenelle (Omaha chief)
Logan, Montana – Captain William Logan (died in the Battle of the Big Hole)
Logansport, Indiana – Captain Logan (Native American chief)
Longmont, Colorado – Stephen Harriman Long (explorer) (indirectly, via Longs Peak)
Longs Peak (Colorado) – Stephen Harriman Long (explorer)
Longville, California – W.B. Long (early hotel and saw mill owner)
Loomis, California – Jim Loomis (railroad agent, postmaster)
Lorenzo, Texas – Lorenzo Dow
Los Angeles – Our Lady the Queen of the Angels
Loudon, New Hampshire – John Campbell, 4th Earl of Loudoun (note spelling)
Louisa, Virginia – Princess Louisa of Great Britain
Louisiana – Louis XIV (King of France) 
Louisiana, Missouri – Louisiana Basye (daughter of local settlers)
Louisville, Kansas – Louis Wilson (landowner's son)
Louisville, Kentucky – Louis XVI of France
Louisville, Mississippi – Col. Louis Wiston (settler)
Loveland, Colorado – William A.H. Loveland (president of the Colorado Central Railroad)
Lovell, Maine – Captain John Lovewell (note spelling)
Lovelock, California – George Lovelock (early merchant)
Lowell, Maine – Lowell Hayden (first person born in the town)
Lowell, Massachusetts, Lowell, Michigan, and Lowell, North Carolina – Francis Cabot Lowell
Lowville, New York – Nicholas Low
Lubbock, Texas – Thomas Saltus Lubbock
Lucas, Iowa – Robert Lucas (territorial governor)
Ludington, Michigan – James Ludington (businessman)
Ludlow, Kentucky – Israel Ludlow (pioneer)
Lufkin, Texas – Abraham P. Lufkin (cotton merchant and Galveston city councilman)
Lumpkin, Georgia – Gov. Wilson Lumpkin
Lundy, California – W.J. Lundy (sawmill owner)
Lunenburg, Massachusetts – from one of the titles of King George II of Great Britain, Duke of Brunswick-Lüneburg
Lunenburg, Vermont – from one of the titles for Prince Karl Wilhelm Ferdinand of Brunswick-Lunenburg
Lusk, Wyoming – Frank S. Lusk (rancher and Wyoming Central Railway stockholder)
Lutesville, Missouri – Eli Lutes (founder)
Luther, Michigan – B.T. Luther (sawmill owner)
Luthersburg, Pennsylvania – W.H. Luther (resident)
Lutherville, Maryland – Martin Luther (16th century German reformer)
Lykens, Pennsylvania – Andrew Lycan (note the spelling)
Lyman, Maine – Theodore Lyman (merchant)
Lyman, New Hampshire – General Phineas Lyman (commander in the French and Indian War)
Lyndeborough, New Hampshire – Benjamin Lynde (Chief Justice of Massachusetts after town was named)
Lyndon, Vermont – Josias Lyndon (governor of Rhode Island)
Lyons, Colorado – Edward S. Lyon (founder)
Lyons, Kansas – Truman J. Lyon (landowner)
Lyons, Nebraska – Waldo Lyon (resident)
Lyonsdale, New York – Calen Lyon (settler)
Lysander, New York – Lysander (Spartan military leader)

M
Mabbettsville, New York – James Mabbett (landowner)
Macclenny, Florida – H.C. Macclenny (founder)
Macksville, Kansas – George Mack (postmaster)
Macomb, New York – Gen. Alexander Macomb
Macon, 5 places in Georgia, Illinois, Mississippi, Missouri, and North Carolina – Nathaniel Macon
Madelia, Minnesota – Madelia Hartshorn (deceased daughter of founder Philander Hartshorn)
Madison, 5 places in Georgia, Kansas, Maine, New Hampshire and Wisconsin – James Madison
Madison, South Dakota – James Madison (indirectly, via Madison, Wisconsin)
Madison County – James Madison, 18 places in
Alabama, Arkansas, Florida, Georgia, Illinois, Indiana, Iowa, Kentucky, Mississippi, Missouri, Montana, Nebraska, New York, North Carolina, Ohio, Tennessee, Texas, and Virginia
Mahomet, Illinois – Muhammad (antiquated spelling)
Mahon, Mississippi – John Mahon 
Mamajuda Island, Michigan – Mamajuda (Native American woman)
Mamakating, New York – Mamakating (Native American chief)
Mamaroneck, New York – Mamaroneck (Native American chief)
Mancelona, Michigan – Mancelona Andrews (settler's daughter)
Manchester, Vermont – Robert Montagu, 3rd Duke of Manchester
Mandeville, Louisiana – Antoine James de Marigny de Mandeville 
Manlius, New York – Manlius (Roman general)
Manly, North Carolina – Gov. Charles Manly
Mannsville, New York – Col. H.B. Mann
Mansfield, Connecticut – Moses Mansfield (mayor of New Haven)
Mansfield, Massachusetts – William Murray, 1st Earl of Mansfield
Mansfield, Ohio – Jared Mansfield (U.S. Surveyor General)
Mansfield, Pennsylvania – Asa Mann (landowner) (note the spelling)
Mansfield, Texas – R.S. Man and Julian Feild (settlers) (note spelling)
Manteo, North Carolina – Manteo (Native American chief)
Manton, Michigan – George Manton (settler)
Manuelito, New Mexico – Manuelito (Navajo chief)
Marcellus, Michigan and Marcellus, New York – Marcus Claudius Marcellus
Marcus Hook, Pennsylvania – Maarte (Native American chief)
Marcy, New York – Gov. William L. Marcy
Margarettsville, North Carolina – Margaret Ridley
Margaretville, New York – Margaret Lewis (landowner)
Marias River (Montana) – Maria Wood
Mariaville, Maine – Maria Matilda (daughter of landholder William Bingham)
Mariaville Lake, New York – Maria Duane (daughter of James Duane)
Marietta, Ohio – Marie Antoinette
Marilla, New York – Marilla Rogers
Marinette, Wisconsin – Marie Antoinette Chevalier (common-law wife of an early fur trader)
Marion – Francis Marion (Revolutionary War hero), 14 places in
Alabama – Illinois – Indiana – Iowa – Kansas – Kentucky – Louisiana – Massachusetts – Mississippi – New York – North Carolina – Ohio – South Carolina – Virginia
Marion, North Dakota – Marion Mellen (daughter of Charles Sanger Mellen)
Marion, Oregon – Francis Marion (Revolutionary War hero) (indirectly, via Marion County, Oregon)
Marion, South Dakota – Marion Merrill (daughter of S.S. Merrill, railroad official)
Marion, Texas – Marion Dove (granddaughter of Joshua W. Young, owner of a plantation that the Galveston, Harrisburg and San Antonio Railway passed through)
Marion County – General Francis Marion of South Carolina, guerilla fighter and hero of the American Revolutionary War, 17 places in
Alabama, Arkansas, Florida, Georgia, Illinois, Indiana, Iowa, Kansas, Kentucky, Mississippi, Ohio, Oregon, South Carolina, Tennessee, Texas, and West Virginia
Marionville, Missouri – Gen. Francis Marion
Marklee Village, California – Jacob Marklee (early settler)
Markleeville, California – Jacob Marklee (early settler)
Marlboro, Vermont – John Churchill, Duke of Marlborough
Marlborough, Massachusetts and Marlborough, New York – John Churchill, Duke of Marlborough
Marlborough, New Hampshire – John Churchill, Duke of Marlborough (indirectly, via Marlborough, Massachusetts)
Marquam, Oregon – Philip Augustus Marquam (resident of Portland)
Marquette – Jacques Marquette (French missionary and explorer), 8 places in 7 states:
 Marquette Heights, Illinois - Marquette, Iowa - Marquette, Kansas - Marquette, Michigan - Marquette County, Michigan - Marquette Island, an island in Michigan - Pere Marquette River, a river in Michigan - Lake Marquette, a lake in Minnesota - Marquette, Nebraska - Marquette (town), Wisconsin - Marquette County, Wisconsin
Marsh Creek Springs, California – John Marsh
Marshall, Colorado – Joseph M. Marshall (coal miner)
Marshall, Minnesota – Gov. William Rainey Marshall
Marshall, Texas – John Marshall
Marshallton, Delaware – John Marshall (mill owner)
Marshfield, Vermont – Capt. Isaac Marsh (landowner)
Martensdale, California – Harry J. Marten (founder)
Martin County, Florida – John W. Martin 24th Governor of Florida
Martinez, California – Don Ygnacio Martínez
Martinsburg, Nebraska – Jonathan Martin (settler)
Martinsburg, West Virginia – Col. Thomas Bryan Martin (landowner)
Martins Ferry, California – John F. Martin (first postmaster and ferry operator)
Martin's Location, New Hampshire – Thomas Martin (grantee)
Martinsville, Indiana – John Martin (commissioner)
Maryland – Queen Henrietta Maria of France
Maryland, New York – Queen Henrietta Maria of France (indirectly, via the state of Maryland)
Marysville, California – Mary Murphy Covillaud (Donner Party survivor)
Marysville, Kansas – Mary Marshall (wife of Francis J. Marshall, namesake of Marshall County)
Maryville, Missouri – Mary Graham (wife of Amos Graham, county clerk)
Masaryktown, Florida – Tomáš Garrigue Masaryk (Czechoslovak President)
Mason, Illinois – Roswell B. Mason (railroader)
Mason, New Hampshire – Captain John Mason (New Hampshire's founder)
Masonville, New York – Rev. John M. Mason (landholder)
Massena, New York – André Masséna (French military officer)
Massillon, Ohio – Jean Baptiste Massillon (French cleric)
Matoaca, Virginia – Pocahontas (Matoaca was her name in her native language).
Mathis, Texas – Thomas Henry Mathis (proprietor)
Matteson, Illinois – George Joel Aldrich Mattison (note the spelling)
Mattoon, Illinois – William Mattoon
Maupin, Oregon – Howard Maupin (settler who established a farm and ferry here)
Mauriceville, Texas – Maurice Miller (son of the first president of the Orange and Northwestern Railway)
Mauston, Wisconsin – Milton M. Maughs (founder) (note the spelling)
Mayer, Arizona – Joe Mayer (founder)
Mayersville, Mississippi – David Meyers (landowner) (note the spelling)
Maynard, Massachusetts – Amory Maynard (mill owner)
Mays Landing, New Jersey – Cornelius Jacobsen May
Maysville, Kentucky – John May (landowner)
McAdenville, North Carolina – R.Y. McAden (state legislator)
McAllen, Texas – John McAllen (settler)
McArthur, Ohio – Gen. Duncan McArthur
McClellandville, Delaware – William McClelland (settler)
McColl, South Carolina – D.D. McColl (businessman)
McConnelsville, Ohio – Robert McConnel
McCool, Mississippi – James F. McCool
McCracken, Kansas – William McCracken (railroader)
McCune, Kansas – Isaac McCune (founder)
McDonough, 3 places in Delaware, Georgia, and New York – Thomas Macdonough (naval officer) (note the spelling)
McFarland, California – J.B. McFarland (founder)
McGraw, New York – Samuel McGraw
McGregor, Iowa – Alexander McGregor (landowner)
McHenry, Illinois – William McHenry
McKee, Kentucky – George R. McKee (judge)
McKeesport, Pennsylvania – David McKee (ferry owner)
McKinleyville, California – President William McKinley
McKittrick, California – Capt. William McKittrick (local landowner and rancher)
McMechen, West Virginia - the McMechen family (pioneers)
McMinnville, Tennessee –Gov. Joseph McMinn
McPherson, Kansas – Major Gen. James B. McPherson
Mead, Colorado – Dr. Martin Luther Mead (landowner)
Meade, Kansas – Gen. George Meade
Meadville, Mississippi – Cowles Mead (territorial official)
Meadville, Pennsylvania – Gen. David Mead (founder)
Mebane, North Carolina – Gen. Alexander Mebane
Medary, South Dakota – Samuel Medary (territorial governor of Kansas)
Meeker, Colorado – Nathan Meeker (journalist)
Mendenhall Springs, California – William M. Mendenhall (health spa proprietor)
Mendoza, Texas – Antonio de Mendoza (colonial governor)
Menifee, California – Luther Menifee Wilson (gold miner)
Mercer, Maine – Brigadier General Hugh Mercer (Revolutionary War hero)
Mercersburg, Pennsylvania – Brigadier General Hugh Mercer (Revolutionary War hero)
Mercey Hot Springs, California – J.N. Mercy (early settler)
Meredith, New Hampshire – Sir William Meredith, 3rd Baronet (member of British Parliament)
Meredith, New York – Samuel Meredith (merchant)
Merrill, Wisconsin – S.S. Merrill (railroader)
Merritt, California – Hiram P. Merritt (early settler)
Methuen, Massachusetts – Sir Paul Methuen (British diplomat)
Mettler, California – W.H. Mettler (local agriculturalist)
Metz, California – W.H.H. Metz (first postmaster)
Meyers, California – George Henry Dudley Meyers (early landowner)
Mianus, Connecticut – Mayanno (Native American chief)
Micanopy, Florida – Micanopy, leading chief of Seminoles, led the tribe during the Second Seminole War
Middleton, New Hampshire – Sir Charles Middleton, 1st Baron Barham
Milan, New Hampshire – Milan Harris (mill owner)
Milbank, South Dakota – Jeremiah Milbank (railroad director)
Milburn, Kentucky – William Milburn
Milesburg, Pennsylvania – Col. Samuel Miles (founder)
Miles City, Montana – General Nelson A. Miles
Miley, California – Julian J. Miley (first postmaster)
Millard, Omaha, Nebraska – Ezra Millard (founder)
Millbrae, California – Darius Ogden Mills
Milledgeville, Georgia – Gov. John Milledge
Miller, Nebraska – Capt. J.M. Miller (settler)
Miller Place, New York – Andrew Miller (pioneer)
Millersburg, Missouri – Thomas Miller (settler)
Millersburg, Ohio – Charles Miller (founder)
Millersburg, Pennsylvania – Daniel Miller (founder)
Millerton, New York – Samuel G. Miller (railroad contractor)
Milliken, Colorado – John D. Milliken (railroad official)
Millis, Massachusetts – Lansing Millis (railroad executive)
Millsfield, New Hampshire – Sir Thomas Mills
Millspaugh, California – Almon N. Millspaugh (first postmaster)
Milo, Maine – Milo of Croton (famous athlete from Ancient Greece)
Milton, California – Milton Latham (railroad engineer)
Milton, 4 places in Ulster County, New York, North Carolina, Vermont, and West Virginia – John Milton
Miltonvale, Kansas – Milton Tootle (landowner)
Minkler, California – Charles O. Minkler (local farmer)
Minor Creek (California) – Isaac Minor
Minot, Maine – Judge Minot of the General Court (aided in the town's incorporation)
Minturn, California – Jonas and Thomas Minturn (local farmers)
Mitchell, Colorado – George R. Mitchell
Mitchell, Iowa – John Mitchel (Irish patriot) (note the spelling)
Mitchell, Oregon – U.S. Senator John H. Mitchell
Mitchell, South Dakota – Alexander Mitchell (president of the Chicago, Milwaukee, St. Paul and Pacific Railroad)
Mitchellville, Iowa – Thomas Mitchell
Moberly, Missouri – Col. William E. Moberly
Modesto, California – William Chapman Ralston, reputed for being a modest man
Moffat, Colorado – David Moffat (president of the Denver and Rio Grande Western Railroad)
Moira, New York – Earl of Moira
Monroe – James Monroe, 12 places in
Connecticut – Georgia – Maine – Massachusetts – Michigan – New Hampshire – New Jersey – New York – North Carolina – Ohio – Utah – Washington
Monroe City, Indiana – Monroe Alton (founder)
Monroeville, California – U.P. Monroe (founder)
Monroeville, New Jersey – Rev. S.T. Monroe
Monroeville, Pennsylvania – Joel Monroe (first postmaster)
Monson, Maine – Sir John Monson, 2nd Baron Monson (indirectly, via Monson, Massachusetts)
Monson, Massachusetts – Sir John Monson, 2nd Baron Monson
Montague, Massachusetts – Capt. William Montague
Monterey, California – Gaspar de Zúñiga, 5th Count of Monterrey (colonial governor)
Monterey, Massachusetts – Gaspar de Zúñiga, 5th Count of Monterrey (indirectly, via Monterrey, Mexico) (The town was named during the Mexican War to commemorate the battle fought there).
Montezuma, Colorado – Moctezuma I (note the spelling)
Montgomery, 4 places in Alabama, Massachusetts, Minnesota, and New York – General Richard Montgomery
Montgomery, Indiana – Valentine B. Montgomery (founder)
Montgomery, Texas – Andrew J. Montgomery (trading post establisher)
Montrose, Pennsylvania – Dr. Robert H. Rose
Mooers, New York – Gen. Benjamin Mooers
Mooney Flat, California – Thomas Mooney (trading post and hotel establisher)
Moorcroft, Wyoming – Alexander Moorcroft (settler)
Moorefield, West Virginia – Conrad Moore
Moores Flat, California – H.M. Moore (first settler)
Mooresville, Indiana – Samuel Moore (founder)
Mooresville, Missouri – W.B. Moore (founder)
Moorhead, Minnesota – Gen. James K. Moorhead
Moorhead, Montana – W.G. Moorehead (railroader) (note the spelling)
Moosup, Connecticut and Moosup River (Connecticut) – Moosup (Native American chief)
Moraga, California – Joaquin Moraga (explorer and landowner)
Moran, Kansas – Daniel Moran (businessman)
Moreau, New York – Jean Victor Marie Moreau (French general)
Morehead, Kentucky – Gov. James Turner Morehead
Morehead City, North Carolina – Gov. John Motley Morehead
Moreno Valley, California – Frank E Brown (Moreno is Spanish for brown); Land developer
Morgan, Utah – Jedediah Morgan Grant (a leader in the Church of Jesus Christ of Latter-day Saints)
Morgan, Vermont – John Morgan (landholder)
Morganfield, Kentucky – Gen. Daniel Morgan
Morganton, North Carolina – Gen. Daniel Morgan
Morgan's Point, Texas – Emily West Morgan (known as The Yellow Rose of Texas)
Morgantown, West Virginia – Zackquill Morgan (landowner)
Morganville, Kansas – Ebenezer Morgan (founder)
Morrill, Kansas – Gov. Edmund Needham Morrill
Morrill, Maine – Anson P. Morrill (governor of Maine)
Morrilton, Arkansas – E.J. and George H. Morrill (settlers) (note the spelling)
Morris, Connecticut – James Morris III (Revolutionary War soldier)
Morris, New York – General Jacob Morris (son of Lewis Morris, a signer of the Declaration of Independence)
Morrisania, New York, New York – Lewis Morris (statesman)
Morris Plains, New Jersey – Lewis Morris (the first royal governor of New Jersey)
Morris Township, New Jersey – Lewis Morris
Morristown, New Jersey – Lewis Morris
Morrisville, Bucks County, Pennsylvania – Robert Morris (financier)
Morrow, Ohio – Gov. Jeremiah Morrow
Morton Grove, Illinois – Levi P. Morton
Moses Lake, Washington – Chief Moses (Native American chief of the Sinkiuse-Columbia)
Moss, Monterey County, California – Charles Moss (wharf owner)
Moss Landing, California – Charles Moss (wharf owner)
Moultonborough, New Hampshire – Colonel Jonathan Moulton and others in his family
Moultrie, Georgia – Gen. William Moultrie
Moultrieville, South Carolina – Gen. William Moultrie
Mount Bullion, Mariposa County, California – Senator Thomas Hart Benton (nicknamed "Old Bullion")
Mount Madison (New Hampshire) – James Madison
Mount Marcy (New York) – Gov. William L. Marcy
Mount Mitchell (North Carolina) – Elisha Mitchell (surveyor)
Mount Monroe (New Hampshire) – James Monroe
Mount Moran (Wyoming) – Thomas Moran (artist)
Mount Morris, New York – Thomas Morris (resident of Philadelphia)
Mount Pulaski, Illinois – Casimir Pulaski (Revolutionary War hero)
Mount Vernon, Missouri – Admiral Edward Vernon (indirectly, via Mount Vernon)
Mount Washington, Kentucky and Mount Washington, Massachusetts – George Washington
Muir, Michigan – W.K. Muir (railroader)
Muldrow, Oklahoma – Henry L. Muldrow (U.S. Representative)
Mullan, Idaho – John Mullan (builder of Mullan Road, a wagon route)
Mulvane, Kansas – John R. Mulvane (resident of Topeka)
Mundy Township, Michigan – Lt. Gov. Edward Mundy
Munfordville, Kentucky – Richard I. Munford (landowner)
Munnsville, New York – Asa Munn (storekeeper)
Murdo, South Dakota – Murdo MacKenzie (Texas cattleman)
Murfreesboro, North Carolina and Murfreesboro, Tennessee – Col. Hardy Murfree
Muroc, California – Ralph and Clifford Corum (early settlers) – Muroc is Corum spelled backwards
Murphy, North Carolina – A.D. Murphy (judge)
Murphys, California – Daniel and John Murphy (early miners and settlers)
Murray, California – David Murray (olive industry figure)
Murray, Kentucky – John L. Murray (former Congressman from the area who had died two years before the city's incorporation in 1844)
Murray, Utah – Eli Murray (territorial governor of Utah)
Murrieta, California – Juan Murrieta (Rancher)
Myerstown, Pennsylvania – Isaac Myers (founder)

N
Naperville, Illinois – Joseph Naper
Napoleon, Michigan – Napoleon Bonaparte
Napoleon, Missouri – Napoleon Bonaparte
Nashmead, California – J. Nash (first postmaster)
Nashville, North Carolina and Nashville, Tennessee – Gen. Francis Nash
Nashville, Ohio – Simon Nash (judge)
Neals Diggins, California – Sam Neal (founder)
Neligh, Nebraska – John Neligh
Nelson, California – A.D. Nelson (early settler)
Nelson, Nebraska – C. Nelson Wheeler (landowner)
Nelson, New Hampshire – Viscount Horatio Nelson (British admiral and naval hero)
Nelsonville, New York – Elisha Nelson (settler)
New Brunswick, New Jersey – George II of Great Britain (also Duke of Brunswick)
New Florence, Missouri – Florence Lewis (settler's daughter)
New Franklin, Missouri and New Franklin, Ohio – Benjamin Franklin
New Marlborough, Massachusetts – John Churchill, Duke of Marlborough (indirectly, via Marlborough, Massachusetts)
New Orleans, Louisiana – Philippe II, Duke of Orléans
New Port Richey, Florida – Captain Aaron M. Richey
New York City and New York (state) – James of York and Albany
Newberry, Michigan – John A. Newberry (railroader)
Newcastle, Maine – Thomas Pelham-Holles, 1st Duke of Newcastle-upon-Tyne
Newell, California – Frederick Haynes Newell
Newellton, Louisiana – Edward D. Newell
Newfane, Vermont – John Fane, 7th Earl of Westmorland
Newnan, Georgia – Gen. Daniel Newnan
Newnansville, Florida – Gen. Daniel Newnan
Newport, New Hampshire – Henry Newport (English soldier and statesman)
Newport News, Virginia – Christopher Newport and William Newce (sea captains) (note the spelling for the latter)
Newton, Georgia and Newton, Texas – John Newton (soldier of the American Revolutionary War)
Nicholasville, Kentucky – Col. George Nicholas
Nichols, California – William H. Nichols (landowner)
Nick's Cove, California – Nick Kojich (restaurateur)
Nickerson, Kansas – Thomas Nickerson (ATSF president)
Nicollet, Minnesota – Joseph Nicollet (explorer)
Nielsburg, California – Arthur C. Neill (first postmaster)
Niles, Fremont, California – Addison Niles
Nobleboro, Maine – James Noble (settler)
Noblesville, Indiana – Gov. Noah Noble
Norden, California – Charles Van Norden (water company official)
Norman, Oklahoma – Abner E. Norman (surveyor)
Normans Kill (New York) – Albert de Norman (settler)
Norristown, Pennsylvania – Isaac Norris (Mayor of Philadelphia in 1724)
North, South Carolina – John F. North (founder)
North Adams, Massachusetts – Samuel Adams (indirectly, via Adams, Massachusetts)
North Anna River (Virginia) – Anne, Queen of Great Britain
North Carolina – Charles I of England (King of Great Britain, Carolinus is Latin for Charles)
North Cleveland, Texas – Charles Lander Cleveland (local judge) (indirectly, via Cleveland, Texas)
North Dansville, New York – Daniel P. Faulkner (settler)
North Fort Myers, Florida – Col. Abraham C. Myers
North Webster, Indiana – Daniel Webster
Norton, Kansas – Capt. Orloff Norton
Norton Sound (Alaska) – Fletcher Norton, 1st Baron Grantley
Nortonville, California – Noah Norton (founder)
Norwell, Massachusetts – Henry Norwell (dry goods merchant)
Notleys Landing, California – Godfrey Notley (founder)
Nottingham, New Hampshire – Daniel Finch, 2nd Earl of Nottingham
Novato, California – a local Miwok leader who had probably been given the name of Saint Novatus at his baptism

O
O'Fallon, Missouri – Col. John O'Fallon
O'Neals, California – Charles O'Neal (merchant and first postmaster)
O'Neill, Nebraska – Gen. John O'Neil (settler)
Oakley, Kansas – Eliza Oakley Gardner
Oatman Flat (Arizona) – Royce Oatman (Oatman and his family were killed by a group of Apaches here).
Oberlin, Ohio – J. F. Oberlin (philanthropist)
Ockenden, California – Thomas J. Ockenden (first postmaster)
Odem, Texas – David Odem (San Patricio County sheriff)
Odenton, Maryland – Oden Bowie (Governor of Maryland)
Ogden, Kansas – Maj. E.A. Ogden
Ogden, New York – William Ogden (landowner's son-in-law)
Ogden, Utah – Peter Skene Ogden
Ogilby, California – E.R. Ogilby (mine promoter)
Oglesby, Illinois – Gov. Richard J. Oglesby
Oglethorpe, Georgia – James Oglethorpe (colonial leader)
Ogletown, Delaware – Thomas Ogle (landowner)
Ogontz, 3 places in Michigan, Ohio, and Pennsylvania – Ogontz (Native American chief)
Oketo, Kansas – Arktatetah (Native American chief)
Old Ornbaun Hot Springs, California – John S. Ornbaun (early settler and rancher)
Olean, New York – Olean Shephard (the first white child born here)
Oleander, California – William Oleander Johnson (first postmaster)
Oleona, Pennsylvania – Ole Bull (settler)
Orange, 5 places in Connecticut, Massachusetts, New Jersey, Vermont, and Virginia – William, Prince of Orange
Orange, Ohio – William, Prince of Orange (indirectly, via Orange, Connecticut)
Orangeburg, South Carolina – William, Prince of Orange
Orbisonia, Pennsylvania – William Orbison (settler)
Ord, Nebraska – Gen. Edward Ord
Ordbend, California – Edward Ord
Ordway, Colorado – George N. Ordway (Denver politician)
Orem, Utah – Walter C. Orem (President of the Salt Lake and Utah Electric Urban Railroad)
Orford, New Hampshire – Robert Walpole, Earl of Orford
Orinda, California – Katherine Philips (a poet whose nickname was "Matchless Orinda")
Orlando, Florida – Orlando Reeves
Orleans, Massachusetts – Louis Philippe II, Duke of Orléans
Orono, Maine – Chief Joseph Orono of the Penobscot Nation
Orrick, Missouri – John C. Orrick (resident of St. Louis)
Orrs Springs, California – Samuel Orr (early settler)
Orwigsburg, Pennsylvania – Peter Orwig (founder)
Osborne, Kansas – Vincent Osborne (member of the Second Kansas Cavalry)
Osburn, Idaho – Bill Osborne (trading post establisher) (note spelling)
Osceola, 5 places in Arkansas, Missouri, Nebraska, New York, and Wisconsin – Indian leader Osceola, whose name means "Black Drink Cry"
Osceola County, 3 places in Florida, Iowa, and Michigan – Indian leader Osceola, whose name means "Black Drink Cry"
Oskaloosa, Iowa and Oskaloosa, Kansas – Oskaloosa (wife of the Native American chief Mahaska)
Oshkosh, Wisconsin – Chief Oshkosh
Otis, Maine – James Otis Jr. (proprietor)
Otis, Massachusetts – Harrison Gray Otis
Otisfield, Maine – James Otis, Jr. (grantee)
Otisville, Michigan – Byron Otis (settler)
Otisville, New York – Isaac Otis (settler)
Otto, New York – Jacob S. Otto (land agent)
Ouray, Colorado – Ouray (Ute chief)
Ovid, Colorado – Newton Ovid (local resident)
Ovid, Michigan and Ovid (town), New York – Ovid (poet)
Owensboro, Kentucky – Abraham Owen
Owingsville, Kentucky – Col. T.D. Owings
Oxnard, California – Henry, Ben, James and Robert Oxnard

P
Pacheco, California – Salvio Pacheco
Paddock, Holt County, Nebraska – Algernon Paddock (U.S. Senator)
Paducah, Kentucky and Paducah, Texas – Chief Paduke
Painesville, Ohio – General Edward Paine (early settler)
Palmer, Massachusetts – Thomas Palmer (judge)
Palmer, Michigan – Waterman Palmer (founder)
Palmer Lake, Colorado – Gen. William Jackson Palmer
Pamelia, New York – Pamelia Brown (wife of Gen. Jacob Brown)
Papinville, Missouri – Pierre Papin
Paragould, Arkansas – W.J. Paramore and Jay Gould (railroaders)
Pardeeville, Wisconsin – John S. Pardee (founder)
Paris, New York – Isaac Paris (merchant)
Parish, New York – David Parish (landowner)
Parishville, New York – David Parish (landowner)
Parker, Kansas – J.W. Parker (landowner)
Parkersburg, West Virginia – Alexander Parker
Parkman, Maine – Samuel Parkman (proprietor)
Parkman, Wyoming – Francis Parkman (historian)
Parkston, South Dakota – R.S. Parke (landowner) (note spelling)
Parkville, Missouri – George S. Park (founder)
Parlier, California – I.N. Parlier (first postmaster)
Parry Peak (Colorado) – Charles Christopher Parry (botanist)
Parsons, Kansas – Levi Parsons (judge and railroader)
Parsonsfield, Maine – Thomas Parsons (proprietor)
Pasco County, Florida – Samuel Pasco, United States Senator from Florida
Paterson, New Jersey – William Paterson
Patten, Maine – Amos Patten (settler)
Patterson, New York – Matthew Paterson (early farmer) (note spelling)
Patton Township, Pennsylvania – Colonel John Patton (co-owner)
Paulding, Mississippi and Paulding, Ohio – John Paulding (Revolutionary War soldier)
Paulsboro, New Jersey – Samuel Phillip Paul (son of a settler)
Pawling, New York – Catherine Pauling (a misprint caused the U to change to a W and the name stuck)
Paxton, Massachusetts – Charles Paxton
Paxton, Nebraska – W.A. Paxton
Payne, Ohio – Henry B. Payne (U.S. Senator)
Payson, Arizona – Levi Joseph Payson (Illinois congressman)
Peabody, Kansas – F.H. Peabody
Peabody, Massachusetts – George Peabody (philanthropist)
Peekskill, New York – Jan Peek (mariner)
Pelham, Massachusetts – Henry Pelham (Prime Minister of the United Kingdom)
Pelham, New Hampshire – Thomas Pelham-Holles, 1st Duke of Newcastle
Pelham, New York – Pelham Burton (tutor of Thomas Pell)
Pembroke, Georgia – Pembroke Whitfield Williams (early resident)
Pembroke, New Hampshire – Henry Herbert, ninth Earl of Pembroke
Pendleton, Indiana – Thomas M. Pendleton (landowner)
Pendleton, New York – Sylvester Pendleton Clark
Pendleton, Oregon – George H. Pendleton (Democratic candidate for Vice-President in the 1864 presidential campaign)
Pendleton, South Carolina – Henry Pendleton (judge)
Penfield, Georgia – Josiah Penfield
Penfield, New York – Daniel Penfield (settler)
Pennsylvania – William Penn (Penn's Woods)
Pepperell, Massachusetts – Sir William Pepperrell (hero of the Battle of Louisburg)
Perham, Maine – Gov. Sidney Perham
Perham, Minnesota – Josiah Perham (officer of the Northern Pacific Railway)
Perinton, New York – Glover Perrin (settler) (note the spelling)
Perkins Township, Maine – Thomas Handasyd Perkins
Perris, California – Frederick Thomas Perris (chief engineer of the California Southern Railroad)
Perry, Kansas – John D. Perry (railroader)
Perry, Maine, Perry, New York and Perry, Ohio – Commodore Oliver Hazard Perry (hero of the War of 1812)
Perry, Florida – Madison Stark Perry, fourth Governor of the State of Florida, Confederate States Army colonel
Perrysburg (town), New York and Perrysburg, Ohio – Commodore Oliver Hazard Perry
Perryville, Missouri and Perryville, New Jersey – Commodore Oliver Hazard Perry
Perth Amboy, New Jersey – James Drummond, 4th Earl of Perth (The article The Amboys contains the etymology)
Peterboro, New York – Peter Smith
Peterborough, New Hampshire – Lieutenant Peter Prescott (land speculator)
Petersburg, Alaska – Peter Buschmann (Norwegian immigrant)
Petersburg, California – Peter Gardett (early merchant)
Petersburg, Delaware – Peter Fowler
Petersburg, Indiana – Peter Brenton (settler)
Petersburg, Pennsylvania – Peter Fleck (settler)
Petersburg, Virginia – Peter Jones (co-founder)
Petersburgh, New York – Peter Simmons (early settler)
Petersham, Massachusetts – William Stanhope, 1st Earl of Harrington, Viscount Petersham
Petersville, Indiana – Peter T. Blessing (founder)
Peytona, West Virginia – William M. Peyton
Pheba, Mississippi – Pheba Robinson
Phelps, Missouri – Gov. John S. Phelps
Phelps, New York – Oliver Phelps (proprietor)
Phil Campbell, Alabama – Phil Campbell (Railroad engineer)
Philippi, West Virginia – Philip P. Barbour (judge)
Phillips, California – Joseph Wells Davis Phillips (founder)
Phillips, Maine – Jonathan Phillips (grantee)
Phillips, Wisconsin – Elijah B. Phillips (railroader)
Philipsburg, Montana – Philip Deidesheimer (mining engineer)
Philipsburg, Pennsylvania – James and Henry Philips (settlers)
Phillipston, Massachusetts – William Phillips, Jr. (lieutenant governor of Massachusetts)
Philipstown, New York – Adolphus Philipse (patentee)
Phillipsville, California – George Stump Philipps (early settler)
Phippsburg, Maine – Sir William Phips (colonial governor of Massachusetts) (note spelling)
Phoenix, New York – Alexander Phoenix
Pickens, Mississippi – James Pickens (landowner)
Pickens, South Carolina – Gen. Andrew Pickens
Pickensville, Alabama – Gen. Andrew Pickens
Pierce, Texas – Thomas W. Pierce (railroader)
Pierceton, Indiana – Franklin Pierce
Piercy, California – Sam Piercy (early settler)
Pierre's Hole (Idaho) – Pierre (Iroquois chief)
Pierre, South Dakota – Pierre Chouteau, Jr.
Pierrepont, New York – Hezekiah Pierrepont (proprietor)
Pierrepont Manor, New York – William C. Pierrepont (resident)
Pierson, Michigan – O.A. Pierson (settler)
Pieta, California – Chief Pieta (local chief)
Piffard, New York – David Piffard (settler)
Pike, New Hampshire – Alonzo Pike (producer of sharpening stones and tool and cutter grinders)
Pike, New York – Zebulon Pike (American soldier and explorer)
Pikes Peak (Colorado) – Zebulon Pike (American soldier and explorer)
Pikesville, Maryland – Zebulon Pike (American soldier and explorer)
Pillsbury, Minnesota – Gov. John S. Pillsbury (businessman)
Pinckney, New York – Charles Cotesworth Pinckney
Pine Hill, California – Safford E. Pine (local dairy farmer)
Pinkham's Grant, New Hampshire – Daniel Pinkham (grantee)
Pishelville, Nebraska – Anton Pishel (postmaster)
Pitcairn, New York – Joseph Pitcairn (proprietor)
Pitcher, New York – Lt. Gov. Nathaniel Pitcher
Pitkin, Colorado – Gov. Frederick Walker Pitkin
Pittsboro, North Carolina – William Pitt, 1st Earl of Chatham
Pittsburg, New Hampshire – William Pitt, 1st Earl of Chatham
Pittsburgh, Pennsylvania – William Pitt, 1st Earl of Chatham
Pittsfield, Maine – William Pitts (proprietor)
Pittsfield, 3 places in Massachusetts, New Hampshire, and Vermont – William Pitt, 1st Earl of Chatham
Pittsfield, Illinois and Pittsfield, New York – William Pitt, 1st Earl of Chatham (indirectly, via Pittsfield, Massachusetts)
Pittsford, New York – William Pitt, 1st Earl of Chatham (indirectly, named by Colonel Caleb Hopkins after his hometown of Pittsford, Vermont)
Pittsford, Vermont – William Pitt, 1st Earl of Chatham
Pittston, Maine – John Pitt (judge)
Plant City, Florida – Henry B. Plant
Plattsburgh (city), New York and Plattsburgh (town), New York – Zephaniah Platt (landowner)
Pleasanton, California and Pleasanton, Kansas – Alfred Pleasonton (Union Army general)
Pocahontas, Illinois and Pocahontas, Missouri – Pocahontas
Pocatello, Idaho – Chief Pocatello
Pokagon Township, Michigan – Chief Pokagon (Pottawattomie leader)
Poland, Maine – Chief Poland
Poland, Ohio – George Poland (proprietor)
Polk County – James K. Polk, 11 places:
Arkansas – Florida – Georgia – Iowa – Minnesota – Missouri – Nebraska – Oregon – Tennessee – Texas – Wisconsin
Polkton, North Carolina – Bishop Leonidas Polk
Polo, Illinois – Marco Polo
Pomeroy, Ohio – Samuel Wyllis Pomeroy (proprietor)
Pomins, California – Frank J. Pomin (first postmaster)
Pompey, New York – Pompey (Roman general)
Pontiac, Illinois and Pontiac, Michigan – Chief Pontiac
Pontotoc, Mississippi – Pontotoc (Chickasaw chief)
Pooler, Georgia – Robert William Pooler (railroad employee)
Pope Valley, California – William Pope (land grantee)
Poplarville, Mississippi – "Poplar" Jim Smith (storekeeper)
Port Arthur, Texas – Arthur Edward Stilwell (founder)
Port Clinton, Ohio – DeWitt Clinton (father of the Erie Canal)
Port Clinton, Pennsylvania – DeWitt Clinton (father of the Erie Canal)
Port Colden, New Jersey – Cadwallader D. Colden (president of the Morris Canal and Banking Company)
Port Dickinson, New York – Daniel S. Dickinson (U.S. Senator)
Port Gibson, Mississippi – David Gibson (landowner)
Port Kenyon, California – John Gardner Kenyon (founder)
Port Jervis, New York – John Bloomfield Jervis (engineer with the Delaware and Hudson Canal)
Port Morris, Bronx, New York – Gouverneur Morris
Port Murray, New Jersey – James Boyles Murray (third president of the Morris Canal and Banking Company)
Port Orford, Oregon – George Walpole, 3rd Earl of Orford
Port Penn, Delaware – William Penn
Port Richey, Florida – Captain Aaron M. Richey
Port Townsend, Washington – George Townshend, 1st Marquess Townshend
Porter, Indiana – Commodore David Porter
Porter, Maine – Dr. Aaron Porter (proprietor)
Portola, California – Gaspar de Portolà
Portola Valley, California – Gaspar de Portolà
Poseyville, Indiana – Gen. Thomas Posey (governor)
Post Falls, Idaho – Frederick Post (lumber mill builder)
Posts, California – William Brainard Post (homesteader)
Potter, New York – Arnold Potter (proprietor)
Potter Township, Centre County, Pennsylvania – Gen. James Potter
Potter Valley, California – William and Thomas Potter (early settlers)
Pottersville, Michigan – George N. Potter
Potts Camp, Mississippi – Col. E.F. Potts
Pottstown, Pennsylvania – John Potts (landowner)
Pottsville, Pennsylvania – John Potts (landowner) (This is the same John Potts as Pottstown).
Poultney, Vermont – William Pulteney, 1st Earl of Bath (note spelling)
Powellton, California – R.P. Powell (early settler)
Powhattan, Kansas – Chief Powhatan (note the spelling)
Pownal, Maine and Pownal, Vermont – Thomas Pownall (royal governor of the Massachusetts Bay Colony) (note spelling)
Poynette, Wisconsin – Peter Paquette (The present name arose from a clerical error).
Prather, California – Joseph L. Prather (early rancher)
Pratt, Kansas – Caleb S. Pratt (Civil War soldier)
Prattsburgh, New York – Capt. Joel Pratt (settler)
Prattsville (town), New York – Zadock Pratt
Preble, New York – Commodore Edward Preble
Prentice, Wisconsin – Alexander Prentice (postmaster)
Prentiss, Maine – Henry Prentiss (landowner)
Prescott, Arizona – William H. Prescott (historian)
Prescott, Kansas – C.H. Prescott (railroader)
Prescott, Massachusetts – Col. William Prescott (Revolutionary War officer)
Presho, South Dakota – J. S. Presho (early settler)
Preston, Minnesota – Luther Preston (millwright)
Preston Township, Wayne County, Pennsylvania – Samuel Preston (judge and settler)
Prestonsburg, Kentucky – James Patton Preston (governor of Virginia)
Prestonville, Kentucky – James Patton Preston (governor of Virginia)
Preston-Potter Hollow, New York – Preston family and Samuel Potter
Pribilof Islands (Alaska) – Gavriil Pribylov (navigator)
Prince Frederick, Maryland – Frederick, Prince of Wales
Prince's Lakes, Indiana – Howard Prince (founder)
Princeton, Indiana – William Prince
Princeton, Maine – Rev. Thomas Prince (indirectly, via Princeton, Massachusetts)
Princeton, Massachusetts – Rev. Thomas Prince
Princetown, New York – John Prince (politician)
Proctor, Kentucky – Rev. Joseph Proctor
Proctor, Minnesota – J. Proctor Knott
Proctor, Vermont – Senator Redfield Proctor
Prophetstown, Illinois – Tenskwatawa (Native American leader called "the Shawnee Prophet")
Prosser, Washington – Colonel William Farrand Prosser (homesteader)
Provo, Utah – Étienne Provost
Puget Sound (Washington) – Peter Puget (explorer)
Pulaski, 6 places in Georgia, Illinois, New York, Tennessee, Virginia, and Brown County, Wisconsin – Casimir Pulaski (Revolutionary War hero)
Pulaski Township, Ohio – Casimir Pulaski (Revolutionary War hero)
Pullman, 3 places in Michigan, Washington, and West Virginia – George Pullman
Pullman, Chicago – George Pullman and Solon S. Beman
Pulteney, New York and Pultneyville, New York (note spelling) – Sir William Pulteney, 5th Baronet, British land speculator
Putnam, Connecticut – Israel Putnam
Putnam County, Florida – Benjamin A. Putnam, Florida legislator, first president – Florida Historic Society

Q
Quanah, Texas – Quanah Parker (the last Comanche chief)
Queens, New York City – Catherine of Braganza
Quenemo, Kansas – Quenemo (Native American resident)
Quincy, Illinois and Quincy, Michigan – John Quincy Adams
Quincy, Massachusetts – Colonel John Quincy
Quincy, Washington – John Quincy Adams (indirectly, via Quincy, Illinois)
Quinlan, Texas – G.A. Quinlan (vice president of the Houston and Texas Central Railway)
Quintana, Texas – Andrés Quintana Roo
Quitman, 4 places in Georgia, Mississippi, Missouri, and Texas – Gen. John A. Quitman (also governor of Mississippi)

R
Rackerby, California – William M. Rackerby (first postmaster)
Radford, Virginia – William Radford
Rahway, New Jersey – Rahway (Native American chief)
Rainier, Oregon – Peter Rainier (British admiral)
Rainsville, Indiana – Isaac Rains (proprietor)
Raleigh, 3 places in North Carolina, Mississippi, and Memphis, Tennessee – Sir Walter Raleigh
Ralston, California – William C. Ralston (mine owner)
Ralston, Pennsylvania – Matthew C. Ralston
Ramseur, North Carolina – Gen. Stephen Dodson Ramseur
Randalls and Wards Islands (New York) – Jonathan Randall (owner)
Randolph, Maine – Peyton Randolph (indirectly, via Randolph, Massachusetts)
Randolph, Massachusetts – Peyton Randolph (first president of the Continental Congress)
Randolph, Nebraska – Jasper Randolph (postman)
Randolph, New Hampshire – John Randolph (Virginia congressman and senator)
Randolph, New York – Edmund Randolph (indirectly, via Randolph, Vermont)
Randolph, Vermont – Edmund Randolph
Rangeley, Maine – Squire James Rangeley, Jr. (proprietor)
Rangeley Plantation, Maine – Squire James Rangeley, Jr. (proprietor)
Ransom Township, Michigan – Gov. Epaphroditus Ransom
Ransomville, New York – Clark Ransom (settler)
Rapidan River (Virginia) – Anne, Queen of Great Britain (The name is a conjunction of the phrase "Rapid Anne").
Rathbone, New York – Gen. Ransom Rathbone (settler)
Rayl, California – David Rayl (hotelier and merchant)
Raymond, California – Raymond Whitcomb (travel official)
Raymond, Maine – Captain William Raymond
Raymond, New Hampshire – John Raymond (grantee)
Raymondville, New York – Benjamin Raymond (land agent)
Raysville, Indiana – Gov. James B. Ray
Readington Township, New Jersey – John Reading (governor of the Province of New Jersey)
Readsboro, Vermont – John Reade (landholder) (note spelling)
Rector, Arkansas – Wharton or Elias W. Rector (politicians) 
Red Cloud, Nebraska – Red Cloud (Lakota chief)
Redding, Connecticut – John Read (landholder) (the spelling was changed to better reflect its pronunciation)
Redfield, Arkansas – Jared Edgar Redfield (railroad executive)
Redmond, Oregon – Frank and Josephine Redmond (homesteaders)
Red Wing, Minnesota – Red Wing (Native American chief)
Reedley, California – Thomas Law Reed (founder and landowner)
Reedsburg, Wisconsin – David C. Reed (settler)
Reeseville, Wisconsin – Samuel Reese (settler)
Reidsville, Georgia – Robert R. Reid (territorial governor of Florida)
Reidsville, North Carolina – Gov. David Settle Reid
Reiff, California – John Reiff (first postmaster)
Remsen, New York – Henry Remsen (patentee)
Reno, Nevada – Jesse L. Reno
Rensselaer, New York – Kiliaen van Rensselaer
Revere, Massachusetts – Paul Revere
Revillagigedo Islands (Alaska) – Count of Revilla Gigedo (Viceroy of New Spain) 
Reynoldsburg, Ohio – Jeremiah N. Reynolds (author and newspaper editor)
Rhinebeck (village), New York – William Beekman (founder) (also named for Rhineland, Germany (Beekman's home))
Rheem, California – Donald I. Rheem (developer)
Ricardo, California – Richard Hagen
Richardson Springs, California – J.H. and Lee Richardson (early developers)
Richburg, New York – Alvan Richardson (settler)
Richland, Washington – Nelson Rich (state legislator and land developer)
Richmond, Maine – Ludovic Stewart, 1st Duke of Richmond
Richmond, Massachusetts and Richmond, New Hampshire – Charles Lennox, 3rd Duke of Richmond
Richmond, Rhode Island – Edward Richmond (colonial attorney general)
Richville, New York – Salmon Rich (settler)
Ridgway, Pennsylvania – John Jacob Ridgway (landowner)
Ridleys Ferry, California – Thomas E. Ridley (ferry operator)
Rienzi, Mississippi – Cola di Rienzo
Rindge, New Hampshire – Captain Daniel Rindge (one of the original grant holders)
Ripley, Maine and Ripley, New York – Brigadier General Eleazer Wheelock Ripley (of the War of 1812)
Rippey, Iowa – C.M. Rippey (settler)
Rising City, Nebraska – A.W. and S.W. Rising (landowners)
Rivanna River (Virginia) – Anne, Queen of Great Britain
Ritzville, Washington – Philip Ritz (settler)
Robbinston, Maine – Edward H. and Nathaniel J. Robbins (landowners)
Robert Lee, Texas – Robert E. Lee (US Civil War General)
Robidoux Pass (Nebraska) – Antoine Robidoux (trader)
Robinson, Kansas – Gov. Charles L. Robinson
Robstown, Texas – Robert Driscoll Jr. (landowner)
Rochester, New Hampshire and Rochester, Ulster County, New York – Laurence Hyde, 1st Earl of Rochester (brother-in-law to James II of England)
Rochester, Minnesota – Colonel Nathaniel Rochester (indirectly, via Rochester, New York)
Rochester, New York – Colonel Nathaniel Rochester
Rockingham, Vermont – Charles Watson-Wentworth, 2nd Marquess of Rockingham
Rockwood, California – Charles R. Rockwood (irrigation promoter)
Rodman, New York – Daniel Rodman
Rohnerville, California – Henry Rohner (founder)
Rolfe, Iowa – John Rolfe (settler of Virginia)
Rollinsford, New Hampshire – descendants of Judge Ichabod Rollins (first probate judge for New Hampshire)
Rollinsville, Colorado – John Q.A. Rollins
Romulus, Michigan and Romulus, New York – Romulus
Roodhouse, Illinois – John Roodhouse (founder)
Roosevelt, New Jersey – Franklin D. Roosevelt
Root, New York – Erastus Root (politician)
Rose, New York – Robert L. Rose (congressman)
Roseboom, New York – Abraham Roseboom (settler)
Ross, California – James Ross (early settler)
Ross Corner, California – W.C. Ross (early settler and merchant)
Rossie, New York – Rossie Parish (proprietor's sister)
Rossville, Kansas – W.W. Ross (Indian agent)
Rossville, Tennessee – John Ross (Cherokee chief)
Roswell, Colorado – Roswell P. Flower (governor of New York)
Roswell, Georgia – Roswell King (founder)
Rothville, Missouri – John Roth (settler)
Rowe, Massachusetts – John Rowe (Boston merchant)
Rowesville, South Carolina – Gen. William Rowe
Rowletts, Kentucky – John P. Rowlett
Royalston, Massachusetts – Isaac Royal (landowner)
Ruckersville, Virginia - John Rucker (founder)
Rulo, Nebraska – Charles Rouleau (note the spelling)
Rumford, Maine – Benjamin Thompson (also known as Count Rumford)
Rumney, New Hampshire – Robert Marsham, 2nd Baron Romney (note spelling)
Rumsey, California – Capt. D.C. Rumsey (early settler)
Rumsey, Kentucky – Edward Rumsey
Rushmore, Minnesota – S.M. Rushmore (pioneer)
Rushville, Indiana and Rushville, Illinois – Dr. Benjamin Rush (Founding Father)
Rusk, Texas – Thomas Jefferson Rusk (signer of the Texas Declaration of Independence)
Russell, Kansas – Capt. Avra Russell
Russell, New York – Russell Atwater (proprietor)
Russell City, California – Frederick James Russell (town planner)
Rutherford, New Jersey – John Rutherford (landowner)
Rutherfordton, North Carolina – Gen. Griffith Rutherford
Ryan, California – John Ryan (borax company official)

S
Sabattus, Maine – Sabattus (Anasagunticook Indian chief)
Sackets Harbor, New York – Augustus Sacketts (settler) (note the spelling)
Safford, Arizona – Anson P. K. Safford (territorial governor)
Sageville, Iowa – Hezekiah Sage
St. Anthony, Minnesota – Anthony of Padua (indirectly, via Saint Anthony Falls)
Saint Anthony Falls (Minnesota) – Anthony of Padua
St. Augustine, Florida – Saint Augustine
St. Augustine, Maryland – Augustine Herman (explorer)
St. Clair, Michigan – Clare of Assisi (note the spelling)
St. Clair, Pennsylvania – Gen. Arthur St. Clair
St. Clairsville, Ohio – Gen. Arthur St. Clair
St. Clement, Missouri – Clement Grote (settler)
St. Deroin, Nebraska – Joseph Deroin (Otoe chief)
Ste. Genevieve, Missouri – Genevieve
St. George, Maine – Saint George
St. George, Vermont – George III of Great Britain
St. George, West Virginia – St. George Tucker (state legislator)
Saint James, Indiana – Saint James
St. James, 5 places in Maryland, Minnesota, Missouri, New York, and North Carolina – Saint James
St. John, Kansas – Gov. John St. John
St. Johns, Michigan – John Swegles Jr. (founder)
St. Johnsbury, Vermont – J. Hector St. John de Crèvecœur (diplomat)
St. Johns River (Florida) – John the Baptist
St. Joseph, Michigan – Saint Joseph (indirectly, via the St. Joseph River)
St. Joseph, Missouri – Joseph Robidoux IV (founder)
St. Joseph River (Lake Michigan) – Saint Joseph
St. Lawrence River – Saint Lawrence
St. Louis, Missouri – Saint Louis
St. Nazianz, Wisconsin – Gregory of Nazianzus
St. Paul, Minnesota – Saint Paul
St. Paul, Nebraska – J.N. and N.J. Paul (settlers)
St. Pete Beach, Florida – Saint Peter (indirectly, via St. Petersburg, Russia)
St. Petersburg, Florida – Saint Peter (indirectly, via St. Petersburg, Russia)
St. Marys River (Michigan–Ontario) – Mary, mother of Jesus
St. Vrain Creek (Colorado) – Ceran St. Vrain (fur trader)
Salamanca (city), New York and Salamanca (town), New York – Don José de Salamanca y Mayol, Marquis of Salamanca
Salisbury, Missouri – Lucius Salisbury (resident)
Sallis, Mississippi – Dr. James Sallis (landowner)
Salyersville, Kentucky – Samuel Salyer (state legislator)
Samsonville, New York – Gen. Henry A. Sampson (note the spelling)
San Andreas, California – Saint Andrew
San Angelo, Texas – Carolina Angela DeWitt (wife of the city's founder Bartholomew J. DeWitt)
San Antonio, Florida and San Antonio, Texas – Saint Anthony of Padua
San Bernardino, California – Saint Bernardine of Siena
San Bruno, California – Saint Bruno of Cologne (indirectly, via the San Bruno Creek)
San Diego, California – Saint Didacus
San Francisco, California – Saint Francis
San Jose, California – Saint Joseph
San Juan Capistrano, California – Saint John Capistrano
San Leandro, California – Saint Leander of Seville
San Lorenzo, California – Saint Lawrence
San Lucas, California – Luke the Evangelist (indirectly, from the Spanish land grant)
San Luis Obispo, California – Saint Louis of Toulouse
San Luis Rey, California – Saint Louis
San Mateo, California – Saint Matthew
San Miguel, San Luis Obispo County, California – Saint Michael
San Pablo, California – Saint Paul
Sanborn, Iowa – George W. Sanborn (railroader)
Sanbornton, New Hampshire – John Sanborn (grantee)
Sanders, California – Charlotte E. Sanders (first postmaster)
Sandisfield, Massachusetts – Samuel Sandys, 1st Baron Sandys (note the spelling)
Sanford, Florida – Henry Shelton Sanford (diplomat and founder)
Sanford, Maine – Peleg Sanford (proprietor)
Sanger, California – Joseph Sanger Jr. (Railroad Yardmaster Association secretary-treasurer)
Sangerfield, New York – Jedediah Sanger (judge)
Sangerville, Maine – Colonel Calvin Sanger (landowner)
Santa Ana, California and Santa Ana Pueblo, New Mexico – Saint Anne
Santa Barbara, California – Saint Barbara
Santa Clara, California – Saint Clare of Assisi
Santa Monica, California – Saint Monica
Santa Ynez, California – Saint Agnes
Sapinero, Colorado – Sapinero (Native American chief)
Saranap, California – Sara Napthaly (mother of a railroad man)
Sarcoxie, Missouri – Sarcoxie (Native American chief)
Sault Ste. Marie, Michigan – Mary, mother of Jesus (indirectly, after the St. Marys River)
Sauvie Island (Oregon) – Jean Baptiste Sauve (dairy owner)
Sayre, Pennsylvania – R.S. Sayre (railroader)
Schererville, Indiana – Nicholas Scherer (German settler)
Schoolcraft, Michigan – Henry Schoolcraft (anthropologist)
Schroeppel, New York – Henry W. Schroeppel (resident)
Schuyler, Nebraska – Vice President Schuyler Colfax
Schuylerville, New York – Gen. Philip Schuyler
Schwaub, California – Charles M. Schwab (note the spelling)
Scipio, New York – Scipio Africanus (Roman general)
Scott, New York – General Winfield Scott
Scottdale, Georgia – George Washington Scott
Scottdale, Pennsylvania – Thomas A. Scott (railroader)
Scotts, California – Charles A. Scott (first postmaster)
Scottsboro, Georgia – Gen. John Scott
Scottsburg, New York – Matthew and William Scott (settlers)
Scotts Corner, California – Thomas Scott, Sr. (local merchant)
Scottsdale, Arizona – Chaplain Winfield Scott
Scottsville, Kentucky – Gen. Charles Scott (also served as governor of Kentucky)
Scottsville, New York – Isaac Scott (settler)
Scranton, Pennsylvania – Selden T. and George W. Scranton (founders of the Lackawanna Steel Company and, later, the city)
Scriba, New York – George Scriba (proprietor)
Searsmont, Maine – David Sears (proprietor)
Searsport, Maine – David Sears (proprietor)
Seattle, Washington – Chief Seattle
Sedgwick, Arkansas – Union Major General John Sedgwick
Sedgwick, Colorado – Union Major General John Sedgwick (indirectly, via Fort Sedgwick)
Sedgwick, Kansas – Union Major General John Sedgwick (indirectly, via Sedgwick County)
Sedgwick, Maine – Major Robert Sedgwick
Sedona, Arizona – Sedona Miller Schnebly (wife of the city's first postmaster)
Seeley, California – Henry Seeley (developer of Imperial County)
Seguin, Texas – Juan Seguin (Texas political figure and Texas Revolution patriot)
Seigler Springs, California – Thomas Seigler (discoverer of the springs)
Selby, California – Prentiss Selby (first postmaster)
Selma, California – Selma Michelsen (wife of railroad employee)
Sempronius, New York – Tiberius and Gaius Sempronius Gracchus (Roman tribunes and agrarian reformers)
Senath, Missouri – Senath Douglass (settler's wife)
Sergeant Bluff, Iowa – Sergeant Charles Floyd
Seward, Alaska, Seward, Nebraska, and Seward, New York – William H. Seward
Seymour, Connecticut – Governor Thomas H. Seymour
Shafter, California – Gen. William Rufus Shafter
Shaftsbury, Vermont – Earl of Shaftesbury (note spelling)
Shakopee, Minnesota – Shakopee (Native American chief)
Shapleigh, Maine – Major Nicholas Shapleigh (proprietor)
Sharon, California – William Sharon (financier)
Sharpsburg, Kentucky – Moses Sharp
Sharpsburg, Pennsylvania – James Sharp (proprietor)
Shaver Lake, California – C.B. Shaver (irrigation company founder)
Shaver Lake Heights, California – C.B. Shaver (irrigation company founder)
Sheffield, Iowa – James Sheffield (railroad contractor)
Shelburne, 3 places in Massachusetts, New Hampshire, and Vermont – William Petty, 2nd Earl of Shelburne
Shelby, New York – Gen. Isaac Shelby
Shelbyville, 3 places in Illinois, Indiana, and Missouri – Gen. Isaac Shelby
Shepherd, Michigan – I.N. Shepherd (founder)
Shepherdstown, West Virginia – Capt. Thomas Shepherd
Sheridan, Montana and Sheridan, Wyoming – General Philip Sheridan (Union cavalry leader in the American Civil War)
Sherman, Michigan – Gen. William T. Sherman
Sherman, New York – Roger Sherman (Founding Father)
Sherman, Texas – Sidney Sherman (Texian patriot)
Shirley, Maine – William Shirley (indirectly, via Shirley, Massachusetts)
Shirley, Massachusetts – William Shirley (governor of Massachusetts)
Shirleysburg, Pennsylvania – William Shirley (governor of Massachusetts)
Shoup, Idaho – George L. Shoup (U.S. Senator)
Shreveport, Louisiana – Captain Henry Shreve, who opened the Red River, which runs through Shreveport, to marine navigation 
Shrewsbury, Massachusetts – George Talbot, 6th Earl of Shrewsbury 
Shrewsbury, Vermont – Earl of Shrewsbury
Shullsburg, Wisconsin – Jesse W. Shull (settler)
Shutesbury, Massachusetts – Samuel Shute (governor of Massachusetts)
Sicard Flat, California – Theodore Sicard (early settler)
Sidney, Iowa – Sir Phillip Sidney (English author) (indirectly, after Sidney, Ohio)
Sidney, Maine and Sidney, Ohio – Sir Philip Sidney (English author)
Sidney, Montana – Sidney Walters (son of settlers)
Sidney, Nebraska – Sidney Dillon (railroad attorney)
Sidney, New York – Admiral Sir Sidney Smith
Sigel, Illinois – Gen. Franz Sigel
Sigourney, Iowa – Lydia Sigourney (poet)
Sikeston, Missouri – John Sikes (founder)
Silsbee, California – Thomas Silsbee (local rancher)
Silsbee, Texas – Nathaniel D. Silsbee (railroad investor)
Simpsonville, Kentucky – John Simpson (U.S. representative)
Sinclairville, New York – Samuel Sinclair (settler)
Sinton, Texas – David Sinton
Skilesville, Kentucky – James R. Skiles
Slates Hot Springs, California – Thomas B. Slate (owner, founder)
Slatersville, Rhode Island – Samuel Slater (founder)
Slaughters, Kentucky – G.G. Slaughter (settler)
Slayton, Minnesota – Charles Slayton (founder)
Sleepy Eye, Minnesota – Ishanumbak (Native American chief whose eyes were said "to have the appearance of sleep.")
Sloan, Iowa – Samuel Sloan (railroad official)
Sloansville, New York – John R. Sloan (settler)
Sloat, California – John D. Sloat (Naval commodore who claimed California for the United States)
Sly Park, California – James Sly (pioneer)
Smartsville, California – Jim Smart (Gold Rush settler and merchant)
Smethport, Pennsylvania – Theodore Smeth (friend of proprietor)
Smith's Ferry, California – James Smith (founder)
Smith Center, Kansas – J. Nelson Smith (soldier) (indirectly, via Smith County)
Smithfield, Maine – Rev. Henry Smith (settler)
Smithfield, New York – Peter Smith
Smithfield, North Carolina – John Smith (state legislator)
Smithflat, California – Jeb Smith (pioneer rancher)
Smith River (Montana) – Robert Smith (Secretary of State)
Smithtown, New York – Richard Smith (proprietor)
Smithville, Missouri – Humphrey Smith (settler)
Smithville, New York – Jesse Smith (lumber dealer)
Snydertown, Northumberland County, Pennsylvania – Gov. Simon Snyder
Soddy-Daisy, Tennessee – William Sodder (trading post proprietor) and Daisy Parks (daughter of a coal company manager)
Solon, Maine and Solon, New York – Solon (statesman and poet of Ancient Greece)
Somers, Connecticut – Lord John Somers of England
Somers, New York – Capt. Richard Somers
Somersville, California – Francis Somers (coal mine founder)
Somerville, Massachusetts – Capt. Richard Somers
Soperton, Georgia – Benjamin Franklin Soper (railroad engineer)
South Amboy, New Jersey – James Drummond, 4th Earl of Perth (The article The Amboys contains the etymology)
South Anna River (Virginia) – Anne, Queen of Great Britain
South Burlington, Vermont – Richard Boyle, 3rd Earl of Burlington (indirectly, via Burlington, Vermont)
South Carolina – Charles I of England (King of Great Britain, Carolinus is Latin for Charles) 
South Euclid, Ohio – Euclid (Greek mathematician)
South Padre Island, Texas – José Nicolás Ballí (Padre Ballí) (Catholic priest and settler)
South Thomaston, Maine – General John Thomas (indirectly, via Thomaston, Maine)
Spafford, New York – Horatio Spafford
Spalding Tract, California – John S. Spalding (founder)
Sparks, Nevada – John Sparks
Spearville, Kansas – Alden Speare (resident of Boston)
Spencer, Indiana – Capt. Spier Spencer
Spencer, Massachusetts – Spencer Phips (acting governor of Massachusetts)
Spencerport, New York – William H. Spencer (settler)
Spivey, Kansas – R.M. Spivey (landowner)
Sprague, Washington – General John W. Sprague (railroad executive)
Spreckels, California – Claus Spreckels (sugar magnate)
Stacy, California – Stacy Spoon
Stafford, Humboldt County, California – Judge Cyrus G. Stafford
Stafford, Kansas – Lewis Stafford (soldier)
Standish, California and Standish, Maine – Myles Standish
Stanfield, Oregon – Senator Robert N. Stanfield
Stanley, North Carolina – Elwood Stanley (U.S. representative)
Stannard, Vermont – George J. Stannard
Stanton, Michigan – Edwin Stanton (Secretary of War)
Stark, Kansas – General John Stark (indirectly, via Stark County, Illinois)
Stark, New Hampshire and Stark, New York – General John Stark (author of New Hampshire's motto, "Live Free or Die")
Starkey, New York – John Starkey (settler)
Starks, Maine – General John Stark
Starksboro, Vermont – General John Stark
Starkville, Colorado – Albert G. Stark (coal mine owner)
Starkville, Mississippi – General John Stark
Stege, California – Richard Stege (founder and landowner)
Stephenson, Michigan – Robert Stephenson
Stephentown, New York – Stephen Van Rensselaer (Lieutenant Governor of New York)
Sterling, Kansas – Sterling Rosan (settlers' father)
Sterling, Massachusetts – General William "Lord Stirling" Alexander (Scottish expatriate) (note spelling)
Stetson, Maine – Amasa Stetson (landowner)
Steuben, Maine and Steuben, New York – Friedrich Wilhelm von Steuben
Steubenville, Ohio – Friedrich Wilhelm von Steuben
Stevens Point, Wisconsin – J.D. Stevens (missionary)
Stevensville, Michigan – Thomas L. Stevens (founder)
Stevensville, Montana – Isaac Stevens (1st governor of Washington Territory)
Stevinson, California – James J. Stevinson (landowner)
Stewartstown, New Hampshire – Sir John Stuart (the town was incorporated following the Scottish spelling of the name)
Stewartsville, Missouri – Gov. Robert Marcellus Stewart
Stewartville, California – William Stewart (local coal mine owner)
Stickney, South Dakota – J.B. Stickney (railroad official)
Stilesville, Indiana – Jeremiah Stiles (proprietor)
Stinson Beach, California – Nathan H. Stinson (landowner)
Stockton, 3 places in California, Missouri, and New York – Robert F. Stockton
Stoddard, New Hampshire – Colonel Sampson Stoddard (grantee of territory)
Stokes Landing, California – James Johnstone Stokes (founder)
Stonewall, North Carolina – Stonewall Jackson (Confederate general)
Stoughton, Massachusetts – William Stoughton (first chief justice of Colonial Courts)
Stoughton, Wisconsin – Luke Stoughton (Englishman from Vermont)
Stoutsville, Missouri – Robert P. Stout
Stoystown, Pennsylvania – John Stoy (settler)
Strafford, New Hampshire and Strafford, Vermont – Thomas Wentworth, Earl of Strafford
Stratham, New Hampshire – Wriothesley Russell, 2nd Duke of Bedford, Baron Howland of Streatham (note spelling)
Stratton, Vermont – Samuel Stratton (settler)
Strong, Maine – Caleb Strong (governor of Massachusetts)
Strong City, Kansas – William Barstow Strong (ATSF president)
Strother, Missouri – French Strother (professor)
Stroudsburg, Pennsylvania – Col. Jacob Stroud (settler)
Struthers, Ohio – Captain John Struthers (founder)
Stuart, Nebraska – Peter Stuart (settler)
Sturgeon, Missouri – Isaac Sturgeon (resident of St. Louis)
Sturgis, Michigan – Judge John Sturgis (settler)
Stuyvesant, New York – Peter Stuyvesant (colonial governor)
Suffern, New York – John Suffern (first Rockland County judge)
Sullivan, Indiana – Daniel Sullivan (soldier)
Sullivan, Maine – Daniel Sullivan (settler)
Sullivan, Missouri – General John Sullivan (indirectly, via Sullivan County, Tennessee)
Sullivan, New Hampshire and Sullivan, New York – General John Sullivan
Sumner, Maine – Increase Sumner (governor of Massachusetts)
Sumter, South Carolina – Gen. Thomas Sumter
Sunderland, Massachusetts – Charles Spencer, 3rd Earl of Sunderland
Sunol, California – Antonio Suñol (Californio ranchero)
Surry, New Hampshire – Charles Howard, Earl of Surrey
Sutro, Nevada – Adolph Sutro
Susanville, California – Susan Roop (daughter of Isaac Roop)
Sutter, California – John A. Sutter (pioneer of the California Gold Rush)
Sutter Creek, California – John A. Sutter
Sutter Hill, California – John A. Sutter
Swainsboro, Georgia – Stephen Swain (state senator)
Swan's Island, Maine – Colonel James Swan of Fife, Scotland (land purchaser)
Sweetland, California – Sweetland brothers (early settlers)
Swepsonville, North Carolina – George William Swepson (capitalist)
Symmes Township, Hamilton County, Ohio – John Cleves Symmes (judge)

T
Taft, California – William Howard Taft
Talbott, Tennessee – Col. John Talbott
Talbotton, Georgia – Gov. Matthew Talbot
Talmadge, Maine – Benjamin Talmadge (landowner)
Talmage, California – Junius Talmage (early settler)
Tamworth, New Hampshire – British Admiral Washington Shirley, Viscount Tamworth
Tancred, California – Tancred, Prince of Galilee
Taopi, Minnesota – Taopi (Native American chief)
Tarkington Prairie, Texas – Burton Tarkington (early settler)
Tarpey, California – Arthur B. Tarpey
Tatamy, Pennsylvania – Tatamy (Native American chief)
Taylor, New York – Zachary Taylor
Taylor County, 4 places in Florida, Georgia, Iowa, and Kentucky – Zachary Taylor, twelfth President of the United States of America
Taylor Ridge (Georgia) – Richard Taylor (Cherokee chief)
Taylorsville, Indiana – Zachary Taylor
Taylorsville, Kentucky – Richard Taylor (proprietor)
Taylorsville, North Carolina – John Louis Taylor (judge)
Taylorville, California – Samuel P. Taylor (paper mill owner)
Tazewell, Georgia and Tazewell, Virginia – Henry Tazewell (U.S. Senator from Virginia)
Tecopa, California – Chief Tecopa (Paiute chief)
Tecumseh, 3 places in Michigan, Nebraska, and Oklahoma – Tecumseh (Native American leader)
Tekonsha, Michigan – Tekonsha (Native American chief)
Temple, New Hampshire – John Temple (lieutenant governor to colonial governor John Wentworth)
Temple, Texas – Bernard Moore Temple (civil engineer)
Templeton, Massachusetts – Richard Grenville-Temple, 2nd Earl Temple
Terry, Mississippi – Bill Terry (resident)
Terry, Montana – General Alfred Howe Terry
Thacher Island (Massachusetts) – Anthony Thacher (sailor shipwrecked there)
Thayer, Kansas – Nathaniel Thayer
Thetford, Vermont – Augustus Henry Fitzroy, 3rd Duke of Grafton, 4th Earl of Arlington and 4th Viscount Thetford
Thibodaux, Louisiana – Gov. Henry S. Thibodaux
Thomaston, Connecticut – Seth Thomas (clockmaker)
Thomaston, Georgia – Gen. Jett Thomas
Thomaston, Maine – General John Thomas of the Continental Army
Thomasville, Georgia – Gen. Jett Thomas
Thompson, Connecticut – Sir Robert Thompson (English landholder)
Thorndike, Maine – Israel Thorndike (landowner)
Thornton, Colorado – Governor Dan Thornton
Thornton, Mississippi – Dr. C.C. Thornton (landowner)
Thornton, New Hampshire – Dr. Matthew Thornton (grantee and signer of the Declaration of Independence)
Throggs Neck, Bronx, New York – John Throckmorton (patentee)
Throop, New York – Gov. Enos T. Throop
Thurman, New York – John Thurman
Thurston, New York – William R. Thurston (landowner)
Tiffin, Ohio – Gov. Edward Tiffin
Tilton, New Hampshire – Nathaniel Tilton (iron foundry owner and hotelier)
Tinley Park, Illinois – Samuel Tinley, Sr. (railroad station agent)
Tipton, Indiana – John Tipton (U.S. Senator)
Titusville, Pennsylvania – Jonathan Titus (landowner)
Todd Valley, California – Dr. F. Walton Todd (store owner)
Tomah, Wisconsin – Tomah (Menominee chief)
Tome, New Mexico – Saint Thomas
Tompkins, New York – Daniel D. Tompkins (Vice President and governor of New York)
Tompkinsville, Kentucky and Tompkinsville, Staten Island, New York – Daniel D. Tompkins (Vice President and governor of New York)
Toms Place, California – Tom Yernby (resort owner)
Toms River, New Jersey – Capt. William Tom (settler)
Tormey, California – Patrick Tormey (landowner)
Torrance, California – Jared Sidney Torrance
Torrey, New York – Henry Torrey
Tower City, North Dakota and Tower City, Pennsylvania – Charlemagne Tower
Towle, California – George and Allen Towle (local lumbermen)
Townsend, Delaware – Samuel Townsend (landowner)
Townsend, Massachusetts – Charles Townshend (British cabinet minister) (note spelling)
Townshend, Vermont – the Townshend family (powerful figures in British politics)
Towson, Maryland – Ezekial Towson (hotelier)
Trenton, New Jersey – William Trent (landholder)
Trexlertown, Pennsylvania – John Trexler
Troy, North Carolina – Matthew Troy (lawyer)
Truesdale, Missouri – William Truesdale (landowner)
Trumbull, Connecticut – Jonathan Trumbull (governor of Connecticut)
Truxton, New York – Commodore Thomas Truxton (naval officer of the American Revolution)
Tryon, North Carolina – William Tryon (colonial governor)
Tuftonboro, New Hampshire – John Tufton Mason (owner of the town)
Tully, New York – Marcus Tullius Cicero
Tunbridge, Vermont – William Henry Nassau de Zuylestein, 4th Earl of Rochford, Viscount Tunbridge, Baron Enfield and Colchester
Tupman, California – H.V. Tupman (landowner)
Turner, Maine – Reverend Charles Turner (agent, later became minister of the town)
Turners Falls, Massachusetts – Captain William Turner
Tuscola, Illinois – Tusco (Native American chief)
Tustin, California – Columbus Tustin
Tusten, New York – Col. Benjamin Tusten
Tuttle, California – R.H. Tuttle (railroad executive)
Twain Harte, California – Mark Twain and Bret Harte
Tygart Valley River (West Virginia) – David Tygart (settler)
Tyler, Texas – John Tyler
Tyngsborough, Massachusetts – Colonel Jonathan Tyng (landowner)
Tyringham, Massachusetts – Jane Tyringham (married name Beresford) cousin of Sir Francis Bernard; the only town in Massachusetts named after a woman;  Sir Francis Bernard inherited Nether Winchendon House, Bucks., England from her

U
Udall, Kansas – Cornelius Udall
Ulysses, Kansas and Ulysses, Nebraska – Ulysses S. Grant
Uncasville, Connecticut – Uncas (Native American chief)
Underhill, Wisconsin – William Underhill (settler from Vermont)
Urban, California – Eva L. Urban (first postmaster)
Uvalde, Texas – Juan de Ugalde (Spanish governor of Coahuila) (indirectly, via Uvalde County, Texas)
Uxbridge, Massachusetts – Henry Paget, 1st Earl of Uxbridge

V
Vacaville, California – Juan Manuel Vaca (founder)
Vade, California – Sieera Nevada "Vade" Phillips (founder's daughter)
Valdez, Alaska – Antonio Valdés y Basán (Spanish naval officer)
Valdosta, Georgia – Augustus (indirectly, via Aosta, Italy)
Vallejo, California – Mariano Guadalupe Vallejo
Van Buren, New York – Martin van Buren
Van Lear, Kentucky – Van Lear Black (businessman)
Van Nuys, California – Isaac Newton Van Nuys (landowner)
Vanceboro, Maine – William Vance (landowner)
Vanceboro, North Carolina – Zebulon Baird Vance (governor and U.S. Senator)
Vancouver, Washington – George Vancouver (explorer)
Van Etten, New York – James B. Van Etten (state legislator)
Vassalboro, Maine – Florentins Vassall (patentee)
Veazie, Maine – General Samuel Veazie (businessman)
Vergennes, Vermont – Charles Gravier, Comte de Vergennes
Verplanck, New York – Philip Verplanck
Vicksburg, Mississippi – Neivitt Vick (founder)
Victoria, Texas – General Guadalupe Victoria (first president of Mexico)
Victorville, California – Jacob Nash Victor
Vidalia, Louisiana – Don José Vidal (colonial governor)
Vidor, Texas – Charles Shelton Vidor (owner of the Miller-Vidor Lumber Company)
Vinalhaven, Maine – John Vinal (Boston merchant who helped settlers obtain title to the land)
Vining, Kansas – E.P. Vining (railroader)
Vinton, California – Vinton Bowen (daughter of a railroad official)
Viola, Wisconsin – Viola Buck
Virgil, New York – Virgil (Roman poet)
Virgilia, California – Virgilia Bogue (daughter of railroad executive Virgil Bogue)
Virginia – Elizabeth I of England, the "Virgin Queen"
Virginia City, Nevada – Elizabeth I of England, the "Virgin Queen" (indirectly, via Virginia)
Volney, New York – Constantin François de Chassebœuf, comte de Volney (philosopher)
Votaw, Texas – Clark M. Votaw (vice president of the Santa Fe Townsite Company, which laid out the town lots)
Voorheesville, New York – Theodore Voorhees (railroader)

W
Wabasha, Minnesota – Wabasha (Native American chief)
Wabaunsee, Kansas – Waubonsie (Native American chief) (note the spelling)
Wacouta, Minnesota – Wacouta (Native American chief)
Waddington, California – Alexander Waddington (local merchant)
Waddington, New York – Joshua Waddington (proprietor)
Wadesboro, North Carolina – Col. Thomas Wade
Wadsworth, Ohio – General Elijah Wadsworth
Wagener, South Carolina - George Wagener (Charleston merchant and railroad company president)
Waite, Maine – Benjamin Waite (lumberman)
Waitsfield, Vermont – General Benjamin Wait (founder)
WaKeeney, Kansas – A.E. Warren and J.F. Keeney (founders)
Wakefield, Kansas – Rev. Richard Wake (founder)
Wakefield, Massachusetts – Cyrus Wakefield (wicker furniture manufacturer)
Wakefield, North Carolina – Margaret Wake Tryon (colonial governor's wife) (indirectly, via Wake County)
Wake Forest, North Carolina – Margaret Wake Tryon (colonial governor's wife) (indirectly, via Wake County)
Walden, New York – Jacob T. Walden
Waldo, Maine – General Samuel Waldo (proprietor)
Waldo, Wisconsin – O.H. Waldo (railroad company president)
Waldo Junction, California – William Waldo (early settler)
Waldoboro, Maine – General Samuel Waldo
Waldron Island (Washington) – W.T. Waldron (sailor)
Wales, Massachusetts – James Lawrence Wales (benefactor)
Walesboro, Indiana – John P. Wales (founder)
Walker Pass (California) – Joseph R. Walker (explorer)
Walker River (Nevada) – Joseph R. Walker (explorer)
Wallace, California – John Wallace (surveyor)
Wallace, Idaho – Colonel W.R. Wallace (landowner)
Wallington, New Jersey – Walling van Winkle (landowner)
Walpole, Massachusetts and Walpole, New Hampshire – Robert Walpole, Earl of Orford
Walsenburg, Colorado – Fred Walsen (store owner)
Walthall, Mississippi – Gen. Edward C. Walthall
Walton (town), New York – William Walton (landowner)
Walworth, New York – Reuben H. Walworth (politician)
Ward, Indiana – Thomas B. Ward (U.S. representative)
Wardner, Idaho – James Wardner (promoter of a local mine)
Wardsboro, Vermont – William Ward (grantee)
Wards Island (New York) – Jasper and Bartholomew Ward (landowners)
Waresboro, Georgia – Nicholas Ware (U.S. Senator)
Warner, New Hampshire – Jonathan Warner (leading Portsmouth citizen)
Warnerville, New York – Capt. George Warner (settler)
Warren, 6 places in Connecticut, Maine, Massachusetts, New York, Pennsylvania, and Vermont – Major General Joseph Warren
Warren, New Hampshire and Warren, Rhode Island – Admiral Sir Peter Warren (British naval hero)
Warren, Ohio – Moses Warren (surveyor)
Warrenton, North Carolina – Major General Joseph Warren
Warrenville, Illinois – Julius Warren (settler)
Warwick, Rhode Island – Robert Rich, 2nd Earl of Warwick
Washburn, Maine – Governor Israel Washburn Jr.
Washington (state) and Washington, D.C. – George Washington
Washington, 14 places in Georgia, Illinois, Indiana, Iowa, Kansas, Maine, Massachusetts, Michigan, Missouri, New Jersey, New Hampshire, New York, North Carolina, and Pennsylvania – George Washington
Washington Court House, Ohio – George Washington
Washington Crossing, New Jersey and Washington Crossing, Pennsylvania – George Washington
Washington Terrace, Utah – George Washington
Washingtonville, New York and Washingtonville, Pennsylvania – George Washington
Waterboro, Maine – Colonel Joshua Waters (proprietor)
Wathena, Kansas – Wathena (Native American chief)
Watkins Glen, New York – Dr. Samuel Watkins (founder)
Watkinsville, Georgia – Col. Robert Watkins (state legislator)
Watrous, New Mexico – Samuel B. Watrous (settler)
Watson, New York – James Watson (proprietor)
Watson, West Virginia – Joseph Watson (landowner)
Wattsburg, Pennsylvania – David Watts (settler)
Wauponsee, Illinois – Waubonsie (Native American chief) (note the spelling)
Wauseon, Ohio – Wauseon (Native American chief)
Wayland, Massachusetts and Wayland, New York – Dr. Francis Wayland (president of Brown University)
Waymansville, Indiana – Charles L. Wayman (founder)
Wayne, Maine – Revolutionary War General Anthony Wayne
Waynesboro, 3 places in Georgia, Mississippi, and Pennsylvania – Revolutionary War General Anthony Wayne
Waynesburg, Pennsylvania and Waynesburg, Ohio – Revolutionary War General Anthony Wayne
Waynesfield, Ohio – Revolutionary War General Anthony Wayne
Waynesville, North Carolina and Waynesville, Ohio – Revolutionary War General Anthony Wayne
Weare, New Hampshire – Meshech Weare (the town's first clerk)
Weatherford, Texas – Jefferson Weatherford (settler)
Webster, Massachusetts and Webster, New Hampshire – Daniel Webster
Webster Groves, Missouri – Daniel Webster
Weedsport, New York – Elisha and Edward Weed (settlers)
Weedville, Arizona – Ora Rush Weed (founder)
Weimar, California – a local Maidu chief
Weir, Kansas – T.M. Weir (founder)
Weissport, Pennsylvania – Col. Jacob Weiss (settler)
Welch, West Virginia – Capt. J.A. Welch
Welcome, Minnesota – Alfred M. Welcome (homesteader)
Weld, Maine – Benjamin Weld (proprietor)
Weldon, California – William B. Weldon (rancher)
Wellington, Colorado – C. L. Wellington (employee of the Colorado and Southern Railway)
Wellington, Kansas and Wellington, Maine – Arthur Wellesley, 1st Duke of Wellington
Wells, Minnesota – the wife of Clark W. Thompson
Wells, New York – Joshua Wells (settler)
Wellsboro, Pennsylvania – Henry Wells Morris (resident)
Wellsburg, West Virginia – Alexander Wells
Wellsville, Kansas – D.L. Wells (railroad contractor)
Wellsville, Ohio – William Wells (founder)
Wendell, Massachusetts – Judge Oliver Wendell of Boston
Wentworth, New Hampshire – Governor Benning Wentworth
Wesley, Maine and Wesley Township, Washington County, Ohio – John Wesley (founder of the English Methodist movement)
Wesson, Mississippi – Col. J.M. Wesson (founder)
West Gardiner, Maine – Dr. Sylvester Gardiner (Boston physician) (indirectly, via Gardiner, Maine)
West Lafayette, Indiana and West Lafayette, Ohio – Gilbert du Motier, marquis de Lafayette
West Richland, Washington – Nelson Rich (state legislator and land developer) (indirectly, via Richland, Washington)
West Virginia – Virgin Queen
West Warwick, Rhode Island – Robert Rich, 2nd Earl of Warwick (indirectly, via Warwick, Rhode Island)
Westbrook, Maine – Colonel Thomas Westbrook (early settler)
Westby, Wisconsin – O.T. Westby (settler)
Westerlo, New York – Rev. Eilardus Westerlo
Westmoreland, New Hampshire – John Fane, 7th Earl of Westmorland
Westport, Oregon – John West
Westville, California – George C. West (first postmaster)
Westville, Mississippi – Col. Cato West
Westville, Missouri – Dr. William S. West (postmaster)
Wetmore, Kansas – W.T. Wetmore (railroader)
Weyers Cave, Virginia – Bernard Weyer
Wharton, New Jersey – Joseph Wharton (co-founder of Bethlehem Steel)
Wharton, Texas – William H. Wharton and John A. Wharton (politicians)
Whately, Massachusetts – Thomas Whately (Member of Parliament)
Wheeler, New York – Capt. Silas Wheeler (settler)
Wheelock, Vermont – Eleazar Wheelock (founder of Dartmouth College)
Whipple Mountains (California) – Amiel Weeks Whipple (military engineer)
White, South Dakota – W.H. White (settler)
White Cloud Township, Mills County, Iowa and White Cloud, Kansas – Ma-Hush-Kah (Native American chief)
Whitefield, Maine and Whitefield, New Hampshire – George Whitefield (English evangelist)
White Haven, Pennsylvania – Josiah White
Whitesboro, New York – Judge Hugh White (settler)
Whitestown, New York – Judge Hugh White (settler)
Whiteville, North Carolina – James B. White (state legislator)
Whiting, Iowa – Charles Whiting (judge)
Whiting, Maine – Timothy Whiting (settler)
Whiting, Vermont – John Whiting (landholder)
Whitingham, Vermont – Nathan Whiting (landholder)
Whitinsville, Massachusetts – Paul C. Whitin (cotton mill owner)
Whitman, Massachusetts – Augustus Whitman (landowner)
Whitman, Washington – Dr. Marcus Whitman (missionary)
Whitney, California – Joel Parker Whitney (rancher)
Whitney Point, New York – Thomas Whitney (postmaster)
Whitneyville, Connecticut – Eli Whitney (founder)
Whitneyville, Maine – Colonel Joseph Whitney (mill owner)
Whittier, Alaska – John Greenleaf Whittier (Poet)
Whittier, California – John Greenleaf Whittier (Poet)
Wibaux, Montana – Pierre Wibaux (cattle rancher)
Wickenburg, Arizona – Henry Wickenburg (discoverer of the Vulture Mine)
Wiggins, Colorado – Oliver P. Wiggins (frontiersman)
Wilber, Nebraska – C.D. Wilber (founder)
Wilcox, Pennsylvania – A.I. Wilcox
Wilcox Township, Michigan – S.N. Wilcox
Wildomar, California – Wil – William Collier, Do – Donald Graham, Mar – Margaret Collier (city founders)
Wilkes County, Georgia and Wilkes County, North Carolina – John Wilkes
Wilkes-Barre, Pennsylvania – John Wilkes and Isaac Barré
Wilkesboro, North Carolina – John Wilkes
Wilkinsburg, Pennsylvania – William Wilkins (Secretary of War)
Willet, New York – Colonel Marinus Willet
Williams, California – W.H. Williams (planner of the townsite)
Williams Bay, Wisconsin – Captain Israel Williams (settler who fought in the War of 1812)
Williamsburg, Ohio – Gen. William Haines Lytle (founder)
Williamsburg, Virginia – William III of England
Williamsport, Indiana – Gov. James D. Williams
Williamsport, Pennsylvania – William Hepburn (judge)
Williams River (Vermont) – Rev. John Williams
Williamson, New York – Charles Williamson (land agent)
Williamson River (Oregon) – Lt. Robert S. Williamson (explorer)
Williamston, South Carolina – Col. James Williams
Williamstown, Kentucky – William Arnold (settler)
Williamstown, Massachusetts – Ephraim Williams
Williamstown, Vermont – Ephraim Williams (indirectly, via Williamston, Mass.)
Williamsville, Missouri – Asa E. Williams (founder)
Williamsville, New York – Jonas Williams (settler)
Willis, Kansas – Martin Cleveland Willis (settler)
Williston, North Dakota – Associate Justice Lorenzo P. Williston
Williston, Vermont – Samuel Willis (landholder)
Willits, California – Hiram Willits (landowner, early settler)
Willoughby, Ohio – Dr. Westel Willoughby, Jr. (U.S. Representative from New York)
Willoughby Hills, Ohio – Dr. Westel Willoughby, Jr.
Wilmette, Illinois – Antoine Ouilmette (French-Canadian fur trader)
Wilmington, 4 places in Delaware, Massachusetts, North Carolina, and Vermont – Spencer Compton, 1st Earl of Wilmington
Wilmot, New Hampshire – Dr. James Wilmot (English clergyman)
Wilseyville, California – Lawrence A. Wilsey (corporate executive)
Wilson, Kansas – Hiero T. Wilson (merchant from Fort Scott)
Wilson (town), New York – Reuben Wilson (settler)
Wilson and Wilson County, North Carolina – Colonel Louis D. Wilson (state senator)
Wilton, New Hampshire – Sir Joseph Wilton (English sculptor)
Winchester, Massachusetts – Colonel William P. Winchester
Winchester, New Hampshire – Charles Paulet, 3rd Duke of Bolton, 8th Marquess of Winchester, and constable of the Tower of London
Windham, New Hampshire – Sir Charles Wyndham, 2nd Earl of Egremont (note spelling)
Windom, Kansas and Windom, Minnesota – Senator William Windom
Windsor, Colorado – Rev. Samuel Asa Windsor
Winfield, Kansas – Chaplain Winfield Scott
Winfield (town), New York – Gen. Winfield Scott
Winn, Maine – John M. Winn (landholder)
Winnie, Texas – Fox Winnie (railroad contractor)
Winnsboro, South Carolina – Gen. Richard Winn (founder)
Winslow, Maine – General John Winslow
Winston-Salem, North Carolina – Joseph Winston
Winters, California – Theodore W. Winters (landowner)
Winthrop, Maine – John Winthrop (first Governor of Massachusetts)
Winthrop, Massachusetts – Deane Winthrop (son of John Winthrop, the first Governor of Massachusetts)
Wofford Heights, California – I.L. Wofford (founder)
Wolcott, Connecticut – Frederick Wolcott
Wolcott, New York and Wolcott, Vermont – General Oliver Wolcott (a signer of the Declaration of Independence)
Wolfeboro, New Hampshire – English General James Wolfe
Womelsdorf, Pennsylvania – Joseph Wommelsdorf (founder) (note the spelling)
Woodbury, Vermont – Col. Ebenezer Wood (grantee)
Woodfords, California – Daniel Woodford (early settler)
Woodhull, New York – Gen. Nathaniel Woodhull
Woodleaf, California – James Wood (property owner)
Woodsfield, Ohio – Archibald Woods (resident of Wheeling, West Virginia)
Woodsonville, Kentucky – Thomas Woodson (senator)
Woodville, Texas – George Tyler Wood (governor of Texas)
Woody, California – Dr. Sparrell Walter Woody (local rancher)
Wooster, Ohio – Gen. David Wooster
Worth, New York – Gen. William J. Worth
Worthington, Massachusetts – Col. John Worthington (proprietor)
Worthington, Minnesota – the maiden name of the wife of A.P. Miller (founder)
Wray, Colorado – John Wray (foreman)
Wright, New York – Silas Wright (politician)
Wright City, Missouri – Dr. H.C. Wright (settler)
Wrightsboro, Georgia – Augustus R. Wright (judge)
Wrightstown, Wisconsin – H.S. Wright (ferry owner)
Wrightsville, Pennsylvania – Samuel Wright (settler)
Wurtsboro, New York – Maurice and William Wurts (builders of the Delaware and Hudson Canal)
Wyandanch, New York – Wyandanch (sachem of the Montaukett Native American tribe in the mid 17th century)
Wytheville, Virginia – George Wythe (a signer of the Declaration of Independence)

Y
Yankee Jims, California – a criminal with that nickname
Yale, Michigan – Elihu Yale (indirectly, via Yale University)
Yaquina Bay (Oregon) – Yaquina (Native American chief)
Yates Center, Kansas – Abner Yates (landowner)
Ybor City, Tampa, Florida – Vicente Martinez Ybor
Yellville, Arkansas – Governor Archibald Yell
Yonkers, New York – Adriaen van der Donck (landowner who known locally as the Jonkheer)
Yorba Linda, California – Bernardo Yorba (built Yorba Hacienda near here)
York, Maine – James II of England (known as the Duke of York before ascending the throne)
Yorkville, California – R.H. York (Founder)
Youngs, California – Morgan W. Youngs (first postmaster)
Youngs Bay (Washington) – Sir Charles Young (naval officer)
Youngstown, New York – John Young (merchant)
Youngstown, Ohio – John Young (Founder)
Ypsilanti, Michigan – Demetrius Ypsilanti (hero in the Greek War of Independence)

Z
Zanesfield, Ohio – Isaac Zane (younger brother of Ebenezer Zane)
Zanesville, Ohio – Ebenezer Zane (founder)
Zapata, Texas – Colonel Jose Antonio de Zapata
Zavalla, Texas – Lorenzo de Zavala (note spelling)
Zebulon, Georgia – Zebulon Pike
Zillah, Washington – Miss Zillah Oakes (daughter of Thomas Fletcher Oakes, president of the Northern Pacific Railway)
Zionsville, Indiana – William Zion (pioneer)
Zwingle, Iowa – Huldrych Zwingli (Protestant reformer)

Former names
Adams was the name of Corte Madera, California – Jerry Adams (first postmaster)
Adele was the name of Fields Landing, California – Adele Haughwout (first European child born there)
Alexander's Corner was the name of Weedpatch, California – Cal Alexander (early resident)
Allen's Camp was the name of Caliente, California – Gabriel Allen (early settler)
Arp's''' was the name of Riverview, Kern County, California – James H. Arp (real estate developer)Barker House was the name of Woodleaf, California – Charles Barker (early settler)Barrons Landing was the name of Eden Landing, California – Richard Barron (landowner)Barrow was the name of Utqiaġvik, Alaska  – Sir John BarrowBeal's Landing was the name of Westport, California – Samuel Beal (early settler)Bells Harbor was the name of Little River, California – Lloyd and Samuel Bell (early settlers)Benton Mills was the name of Ridleys Ferry, California – Senator Thomas Hart BentonBiddle's Camp and Biddleville were names of Bear Valley, Mariposa County, California – William C. Biddle (early settler)Black's was the name of Zamora, California – J.J. Black (early settler)Boust City was the name of Taft Heights, California – E.J. Boust (oilman, town founder)Bowman's Point was the name of West End, Alameda, California – Charles C. Bowman (early settler)Brannan Springs was the name of Woodfords, California – Samuel Brannan (Gold Rush figure)Brown's was the name of North Fork, California – Milton Brown (early settler)Brown's Mill was the name of Stafford, Humboldt County, California – Percy Brown (lumber mill owner)Brownsville was the name of Samoa, California – James D.H. Brown (dairy farmer)Brownsville was the name of Tecopa, California – William D. and Robert D. Brown (founders)Buckingham was the name of Unity, New Hampshire – John Hobart, 1st Earl of BuckinghamshireBucktooth was the name of Salamanca (town), New York – Bucktooth (notable Native American who lived in the area)Bulwinkle was the name of Crannell, California – Conrad Bullwinkle (landowner)Burns' Camp and Burns' Ranch were names of Quartzburg, Mariposa County, California – Robert and John Burns (founders)Burrville was the name of Clinton, Tennessee – Aaron BurrCabarker was the name of El Centro, California – C.A. Barker (landowner's friend)Cantu was the name of Andrade, California – Col. Esteban Cantu (Mexican regional governor)Cardigan was the name of Orange, New Hampshire – George Brudenell, fourth Earl of CardiganCarson's Creek was the name of Angels Camp, California – Kit CarsonCharley's Flat was the name of Dutch Flat, California – Charles Dornbach (founder)Clark's Station and Clark's Ranch were names of Wawona, California – Galen Clark (founder)Clifton was the name of Del Rey, California – Clift Wilkinson (town founder)Cochran's Crossing was the name of Yolo, California – Thomas Cochran (early settler)Cockermouth was the name of Groton, New Hampshire – Charles Wyndham, Baron Cockermouth and Earl of EgremontCollis was the name of Kerman, California – Collis Potter HuntingtonConverse Ferry was the name of Friant, California – Charles Converse (ferryman)Cowan Station was the name of Dunmovin, California – James Cowan (homesteader)Crabtown was the name of Helena, Montana – John Crab (early gold prospector)Crumville was the name of Ridgecrest, California – James and Robert Crum (local dairymen)Dewey and Deweyville were names of Wasco, California – Adm. George DeweyDorris Bridge was the name of Alturas, California – Pressley and James Dorris (early settlers)Dow's Prairie was the name of McKinleyville, California – Joe Dow (founder)Drapersville was the name of Kingsburg, California – Josiah Draper (founder)Dupplin was the name of Lempster, New Hampshire – Scottish lord Thomas Hay, Viscount DupplinDurkee's Ferry was the name of Weitchpec, California – Clark W. Durkee (ferry operator)Dutch Charlie's Flat was the name of Dutch Flat, California – Charles Dornbach (founder)Dykesboro was the name of Cochran, Georgia – B. B. Dykes (settler)Eastland was the name of Mill Valley, California – Joseph G. Eastland (developer)Enfield was the name of a Massachusetts town that was disincorporated on April 28, 1938, as part of the creation of the Quabbin Reservoir – Robert Field (early settler)Etter was the name of Ettersburg, California – Albert F. Etter (homesteader)Fassking's Station was the name of Encinal, Alameda, California – Frederick Louis Fassking (pioneer)Fletcher was the name of Aurora, Colorado – Donald Fletcher (businessman)Foremans was the name of Fourth Crossing, California – David Foreman (town founder)Franklin Township was the name of Nutley, New Jersey – Benjamin FranklinGreenwich was the name of a Massachusetts town that was disincorporated on April 28, 1938, as part of the creation of the Quabbin Reservoir – John Campbell, Duke of GreenwichGrenville was the name of Newport, New Hampshire – George Grenville (Prime Minister of the United Kingdom)Hamilton's was the name of Buck Meadows, California – Alva Hamilton (founder)Hamptonville was the name of Friant, California – William R. Hampton (first postmaster)Hans Lof's was the name of Toms Place, California – Hans Lof (resort owner)Hansen was the name of Alton, California – Mads P. Hansen (first postmaster)Harrisberry was the name of Harrisburg, Inyo County, California – Shorty Harris and Pete Auguerreberry (gold discoverers)Harrisburgh was the name of Warm Springs, Fremont, California – Abram Harris (early settler)Haydenville was the name of Bear Valley, Mariposa County, California – David, Charles, and William Hayden (gold miners)Hearst was the name of Hacienda, California – Phoebe HearstHopkins and Hopkins Springs was the name of Soda Springs, Nevada County, California – Mark Hopkins (railroad baron who built a resort there)Hunter Flat and Hunters Camp were names of Whitney Portal, California – William L. Hunter (pioneer)Hupp and Hupps Mill were names of DeSabla, California – John Hupp (early sawmill owner)Hutton's Ranch was the name of Yolo, California – James A. Hutton (early hotel owner)Jacksonville was the name of Floyd, Virginia – President Andrew JacksonJewetta' was the name of Saco, California – Solomon and Philo D. Jewett (pioneers)Joe was the name of Ismay, Montana – Joe Montana, (American Football player)Johnson's Diggings was the name of Birchville, California – David Johnson (first prospector at the site)Johnsonville was the name of Bear Valley, Mariposa County, California – John F. Johnson (early settler)Jones Ferry was the name of Friant, California – J.R. Jones (early merchant)Kellyvale was the name of Lowell, Vermont – John Kelley (grantee)Kendall's City was the name of Boonville, California – Alonzo Kendall (early hotelier)Kents Landing was the name of Little River, California – W.H. Kent (early settler, landowner)Kenyon was the name of Pineridge, California – Silas W. Kenyon (first postmaster)Kunze was the name of Greenwater, California – Arthur Kunze (founder)Langville was the name of Capay, California – John Arnold Lang (early settler)Laphams was the name of Stateline, California – William W. Lapham (hotel owner)Levittown and Levittown Township were names of Willingboro Township, New Jersey (from 1958 to 1963) – William LevittLewisville was the name of Greenwood, El Dorado County, California – Lewis B. Meyer (early settler)Lisbon was the name of Applegate, California – Lisbon Applegate (early settler)Maltermoro was the name of Sunnyside, Fresno County, California – George H. Malter (postmaster)Marthasville was the name of Atlanta, Georgia – Martha Lumpkin (daughter of Governor Wilson Lumpkin)Marsh was the name of Avon, Contra Costa County, California – John MarshMarshall was the name of Lotus, California – James W. MarshallMarshs Landing was the name of Antioch, California – John MarshMaxwell's Creek was the name of Coulterville, California – George Maxwell (early settler)McKinney was the name of Chambers Lodge, California – John McKinney (early settler)Meiggstown was the name of Mendocino, California – Henry MeiggsMichaels was the name of Coarsegold, California – Charles Michaels (merchant)Mingusville was the name of Wibaux, Montana – Minnie and Gus Grisy (postmasters)Minorsville was the name of McKinleyville, California – Isaac Minor (founder)Moores was the name of Riverton, California – John M. Moore (operator of a local toll road)Moores Station was the name of Honcut, California – John C. Moore (first postmaster)Norris was the name of Lake Delton, Wisconsin – Edward Norris (surveyor)Old Lovelock was the name of Coutolenc, California – George Lovelock (early merchant)Partridgefield was the name of Hinsdale, Massachusetts – Oliver Partridge (one of the purchasers of the town)Peacock's was the name of Warm Springs, Fremont, California – George W. Peacock (first postmaster)Peterman's Landing was the name of Eden Landing, California – Henry Louis and Mary F. Peterman (salt company officials)Phillipsburg was the name of Hollis, Maine – Major William Phillips (proprietor)Phipps-Canada was the name of Jay, Maine – Captain Joseph PhippsPollasky was the name of Friant, California – Marcus Pollasky (railroad official)Portersville was the name of Valparaiso, Indiana – Commodore David PorterPowellville was the name of Blocksburg, California – Joseph James Powell (first settler)Prescott was the name of a Massachusetts town that was disincorporated on April 28, 1938, as part of the creation of the Quabbin Reservoir – Colonel William PrescottPutnam's was the name of Independence, California – Charles Putnam (early merchant)Ralston City was the name of Shakespeare, New Mexico – William Chapman RalstonRalston Point was the name of Arvada, Colorado – Lewis Ralston (prospector from Georgia)Randall was the name of White Hall, California – Albert B. Randall (first postmaster)Rolph was the name of Fairhaven, California – James Rolph (governor of California)Rooptown was the name of Susanville, California – Isaac Roop (settler)Ross Landing was the name of Kentfield, California – James Ross (founder)Ross's Camp was the name of Melbourne Camp, California – William Ross (operator)Rust was the name of El Cerrito, Contra Costa County, California – William R. Rust (first postmaster)Ryan was the name of Lila C, California – John Ryan (borax company official)Scodie was the name of Onyx, California – William Scodie (early merchant)Sherburne was the name of Killington, Vermont – Colonel Benjamin Sherburne (landholder)Simpsonville was the name of Bear Valley, Mariposa County, California – Robert Simpson (local merchant)Smith's Landing was the name of Antioch, California – William and Joseph Smith (early settlers)Smithville was the name of Loomis, California – L.G. Smith (store owner)Sotoville was the name of Santa Rita, Monterey County, California – Jose Manuel Soto (landowner, founder)Spoonville was the name of Edgemont, Lassen County, California – Lorella A. SpoonStantonville was the name of Chilton, Wisconsin – Moses and Catherine Stanton (early residents)Stratton was the name of Stratford, California – William Stratton (developer)Stubbs was the name of Clearlake Oaks, California – Charles Stubbs (landowner)Surrattsville was the name of Clinton, Maryland – Surratt family (18th century settlers)Swauger was the name of Loleta, California – Samuel A. Swauger (landowner)Taylors Landing was the name of Bijou, California – Almon M. Taylor (founder)Tinkers Station was the name of Soda Springs, Nevada County, California – J.A. Tinker (local freight hauler)Townsend was the name of Boothbay, Maine and Southport, Maine – Charles Townshend, 2nd Viscount Townshend (note spelling)Trecothick was the name of Ellsworth, New Hampshire – Barlow Trecothick (Alderman, Member of Parliament, and a Lord Mayor of London, raised in colonial Boston)Troupville was the name of Valdosta, Georgia - George Troup, governor of GeorgiaTurner was the name of Harriman, New York – Peter Turner (early restaurateur)Vaughn was the name of Bodfish, California – Edward Vaughn (first postmaster)Villa de San Agustin de Laredo was the name of Laredo, Texas – Saint AugustineWarnersville was the name of Trinidad, California – R.V. Warner (early settler)Washington was the name of South River, New Jersey – George WashingtonWashington Township was the name of Robbinsville Township, New Jersey – George WashingtonWells was the name of Keene, California – Madison P. Wells (early rancher)Wendell was the name of Sunapee, New Hampshire – John Wendell (proprietor)Weringdale was the name of Woody, California – Joseph Weringer (town planner)Wheelersborough was the name of Hampden, Maine – Benjamin Wheeler (settler)Whitley's Ford was the name of Lookout, California – James W. Whitley (early hotelier)Williamsburg was the name of Old Town, Kern County, California – James E. Williams (businessman)Woods Dry Diggings was the name of Auburn, California – John S. WoodYanks'' was the name of Meyers, California – Ephraim "Yank" Clement (early landowner)

See also
List of places named after people
List of country subdivisions named after people
List of islands named after people
Buildings and structures named after people
List of educational institutions named after U.S. presidents
List of eponyms of airports
List of convention centers named after people
List of railway stations named after people
Lists of places by eponym
List of non-US places that have a US place named after them
List of eponyms
Lists of etymologies

Notes

References

Bibliography
 
 
 
 
 
 
 
 
 
 
 
 

Lists of eponyms
Lists of places named after people
People
Lists of United States placename etymology